= Comparison of mobile operating systems =

This is a comparison of mobile operating systems. Only the latest versions are shown in the table below, even though older versions may still be marketed.

== About OS ==
About OS
Feature	Android	iOS	HarmonyOS	Tizen	KaiOS	Sailfish OS	GrapheneOS	Ubuntu Touch	Mobian	Plasma Mobile	PureOS	Nura
Developed by	Google	Apple Inc.	Huawei	Linux Foundation, Samsung, Intel	KaiOS Technologies Inc.(TCL)	Sailfish Alliance, Mer, Jolla and Sailfish community contributors	GrapheneOS Foundation	UBports and Ubuntu community contributors (previously Canonical Ltd.)	Debian on Mobile Team	KDE and Blue Systems	Purism	Nura community
Market share	73%	22%	5%	0.22%	0.14%	—N/a	—N/a	—N/a	—N/a	—N/a	—N/a	—N/a
License	Partial; base system is open source, but many devices use proprietary drivers for hardware support, and most Android operating systems include Proprietary apps (such as Google Play and other Google apps).	Proprietary, open source kernel and core	Proprietary except for open-source components	Partial; both proprietary and open-source components, assorted licenses	Proprietary except for open source kernel patches (formerly the MPL 2.0 B2G OS)	Partial; free and open-source, but the UI and the SDK are proprietary and closed source	Partial; free and open-source system with proprietary drivers	Free Free and open-source, mainly GPL	Free, Free and open-source, mainly GPL	Free, Free and open-source, mainly GPL	Free, Free and open-source, mainly GPL	Free, Free and open-source, GPL
Current version	17	27.0	6.0	9.0 M2	3.1	5.1	2026081300	24.04-1.3	12.0	6.3.5	10.3	26.06
Development version					3.2	Unknown	2026081300	Unknown	20250615	Unknown	Unknown	—N/a
Current version release dates	June 16, 2026; 5 months ago	September 14, 2026; 2 months ago	November 25, 2025; 11 months ago	May 30, 2020; 6 years ago	?	May 16, 2026; 6 months ago	13 August 2026; 3 months ago	June 3, 2025; 17 months ago	June 6, 2023; 3 years ago	May 6, 2025; 18 months ago	June 14, 2023; 3 years ago	June 21, 2026; 4 months ago
OS family	Modified Linux kernel based	Darwin	OpenHarmony	Linux (based on a combination of MeeGo and Samsung Bada)	Firefox OS / Open Web (based on Linux kernel)	Linux	Based on the Android kernel (modified Linux kernel), added hardening patches	Linux (based on Ubuntu)	Linux (based on Debian)	Linux (mainly based on KDE neon )	Linux (based on Debian)	Linux (based on Alpine Linux)
Supported CPU architecture	ARM (32-bit ARMv7-A and 64-bit ARMv8-A / ARMv9-A only), x86, x86-64	64-bit ARMv8-A / ARMv9-A only	64-bit ARM	ARM, x86, x86-64	ARM	ARM, x86-64	ARM (32-bit ARMv7-A and 64-bit ARMv8-A only), x86, x86-64 (Only devices with ARMv8-A and newer CPUs are officially supported, due to the MTE requirement)	ARM, x86-64	64-bit ARM	ARM	ARM, ?	Convergence operating system
Programmed in	C, C++, Java, Kotlin, Rust	C, C++, Objective-C, Swift	C, C++, JS, ArkTS, Cangjie	C++, Xamarin.Forms (.NET C#, F#, VB)	HTML5, JavaScript	C++, QML, Python	C, C++, Java, Kotlin, Rust	Apps: HTML5, QML, Go, JavaScript, C++ System: C, C++, QML	C, C++	C++, QML	?	Python install tool and shell script packages
Public issues list	Yes	3rd party	Yes	Yes	No	Yes	Yes	Yes	Yes	Yes	Yes	Yes
DRM-free	No since Android 4.1 and Android 4.3 and more restrictions on Android 4.4	No – FairPlay	No – Huawei WisePlay	Yes	?	Yes	No - Widevine	Yes	Yes	Yes	Yes	Yes
Device independent system updates	Partial system updates since Oreo 3rd party software like LineageOS	Yes	Yes	No	For feature phones, not smartphones	Yes	Yes (legacy extended support)	Yes	?	?	?	Yes. Intended for use on old mobile devices
Wireless system updates	Yes	5+	Yes	No	?	Yes	Yes	Yes	?	?	?	Yes
GPU accelerated GUI	3+	Yes	Yes. Since 3.0	Yes	?	Yes	Yes	Yes	?	?	?	Partial. Works for some devices
Feature	Android	iOS	HarmonyOS	Tizen	KaiOS	Sailfish OS	GrapheneOS	Ubuntu Touch	Mobian	Plasma Mobile	PureOS	Nura

== Advanced controls ==
Advanced controls
Feature	Android	iOS	Tizen	GrapheneOS	Sailfish OS	Ubuntu Touch	HarmonyOS
While-in-use permissions	10+	11+: Location only	No	Yes	No	Yes	3.0+
Per-app Internet access	No, 3rd party software	7+: Cellular only; 3rd party software on jailbroken devices	No	Yes	No	No	No
Per-app identity access	8+	6+	No	Yes	No	Yes	2.0+
Per-app user data access	6+	6+	No	Yes	No	Yes	3.0+
Per-app background execution	No, 3rd party apps available	7+	No	Yes	No	Background execution not allowed	2.0+
Per-app notifications	4.1+	5+	No	Yes	No	Yes	2.0+
Per-app location access	6+	4+	No	Yes	No	Yes	2.0+
Per-app camera access	6+	8+	No	Yes	No	Yes	Yes
Per-app microphone access	6+	7+	No	Yes	No	Yes	Yes
Per-app shared files access	6+	8+	No	Yes, Storage Scopes	No	Yes	Yes
Per-app network data usage auditing	4+	Yes	?	Yes	No	No	Yes
Fine grained storage usage	Yes	5+	?	Yes	No	Yes	Yes
Parental controls	4.3+ or 3rd party software	Yes	?	3rd party software	No	No	2.0+
Screen orientation lock	Yes	Yes	?	Yes	1.0.4+	Yes	2.0+
File manager	6.0+	11+	3rd party software	Yes	Yes	Yes	Yes
File manager write access to external storage	6+ Or 3rd party software like LineageOS	13+	Yes	Yes	Yes	Yes	Yes
Multi-user	4.2+, including phones 5+	9.3+: Education use only on iPad	No	Yes, up to 32 profiles (31 + guest profile)	3.4.0+	No	Yes
Guest mode	5+	6+	No	Yes	3.4.0+	No	Yes
Guided Access	Yes	Yes	No	Yes	No	No	3.0+
Do not disturb mode	5+	6+	No	Yes	No	No	2.0+
App groups	Yes	4+	?	Yes	1.0.7+	Yes	Yes

== Accessibility features ==
Accessibility features
Feature	Android	iOS	Tizen	Sailfish OS	Ubuntu Touch	HarmonyOS
System wide base text size	Yes	Yes	?	2.1.0+: Set text size	3rd party software	Yes
Monaural output	Yes	Yes	No	No	No	Yes
Always visible scrollbar	No	No	No	No	No	No
Reduced Animations	Yes	Yes	No	No	No	Yes

== App ecosystem ==
App ecosystem
Feature	Android	iOS	Tizen	Sailfish OS	Ubuntu Touch	HarmonyOS	Nura
Official app store	Google Play	App Store	Tizen Store	Jolla Store	OpenStore	AppGallery	GNOME Software, KDE Discover
Non-discriminatory stores	No, Some apps like Ad blockers are censored on Google Play but developers can distribute apps from their own sources	No, Apple discriminates based on country and own Apple policies	?	Openrepos. Developers can distribute apps from their own sources, supports multiple app stores	Yes	No, Huawei discriminates based on country and own Huawei AppGallery policies for native based HarmonyOS apps. But OpenHarmony developers can distribute apps from their own sources	Yes
Common APIs for smartphones, tablets, and PCs	Yes	Smartphone and tablet only	No	Yes	Yes	Yes	Yes
Official SDK platform(s)	Linux, macOS and Windows	macOS using iOS SDK	Linux, Windows, macOS	Windows, macOS and Linux	Yes	macOS and Windows	No
Cost to develop for the mobile OS	Free	No, Requires Apple hardware.	Free	Free	Free	Free	Free
Cost to publish app to official store	US$25 once to register to offer on Google Play	US$99/year	Free	Free	Free	Free	Free

== Browser ==
Browser
Feature	Android	iOS	Tizen	Sailfish OS	Ubuntu Touch	HarmonyOS
Default web browser/engine	Blink	WebKit		Gecko	Qt WebEngine (based on Blink)	Blink (Servo - OniroOS/OpenHarmony)
Major web browsers available	Chrome for Android, Opera, Firefox, Microsoft Edge, Samsung Internet	Safari, Chrome for iOS, Opera, Firefox, Microsoft Edge	Tizen Browser (Based on UC Browser)	Sailfish Browser (Gecko), Webcat (WebKit), Web Pirate (WebKit), others via Android (Firefox, Chrome, Opera)	Morph Browser	Huawei Browser, Microsoft Edge (Blink), UC Browser (Blink, V8), Opera browser (Blink, V8), Yandex Browser (Blink), Vivaldi Browser (Blink, V8)
Browser can use its own engine	Yes	17.4+: Only users living in European Union countries	Yes	Yes	Yes	Yes
Browser extensions	No 3rd party software	Yes on Safari	No	No	No	No
Browser direct Internet connection (increased resilience to outages)	Yes	Yes	Yes	?	?	Yes
Browser undo close tab	Google Chrome for Android	8+	No	No	No	No
Browser keeps windows open on shutdown or crash	2.3+ Google Chrome but not on the deprecated AOSP browser	Yes	No	Yes	Yes	Yes
Browser keeps windows open when cleaning cookies	Yes	3rd party software	?	Yes	Yes	Yes
Browser search engine options	Many	Bing, Google, Yahoo! Search, DuckDuckGo, Ecosia	Bing, Google, Yahoo! Search	Bing, Google, Yahoo, Yandex. Baidu, DuckDuckGo, StartPage, Searx, ixquick, Swisscows, Qwant, Seznam, Hulbee via openrepos	Baidu, Bing, DuckDuckGo, Ecosia, Google, lilo, Peekier, Qwant, Wikipedia, Yahoo	Bing, Google, Yahoo! Search, Baidu, DuckDuckGo
Browser find on page	1.5+	Yes	Yes	1.1.2+	Yes	Yes
Browser–email save images	Yes	Yes	?	Yes	Yes	Yes
Browser–email save PDFs	Yes	Yes	Yes	Yes	Yes	Yes
Browser save audio/video	Yes, but only links, not embedded media	13+; 5+: 3rd party software	Yes	Yes	Yes	Yes
Browser save page	Yes, Google Chrome 55+	6+: Offline Reading List; 3rd party software	Yes	4.0.1.48+	Yes	Yes
Browser save any file	Yes, Chrome for Android.	13+; 5+: When an app that can handle/open the filetype is installed (excluding audio/video – requires 3rd party software);	?	Yes	Yes	Yes
Browser force enable zoom	Yes, Chrome for Android	Yes	?	?	?	No
Browser text reflow	No, removed on Android 4.4	5+: Only on pages with reader mode available 3rd party browsers on prior versions	No	No	No	No
Browser Reader Mode	No, 3rd party software	5+	Yes	No	No	No
Browser open PDFs without storing	No	Yes	No	No	No	No
Browser file upload	2.2+	9+; 6–8: Limited	Yes	1.0.7+	Yes	Yes
Browser form navigation	Next button	Previous, Next, AutoFill, and Done buttons	?	?	?	Yes
Browser private browsing mode	3.0+ with AOSP browser or with Chrome for Android	5+	Yes	1.1.6+	Yes	Yes
Offline web apps	Yes	Yes	No	?	Yes	Yes
HTTP Live Streaming	3+	3+	No	?	Yes	Yes
WebRTC	Yes	11+	No	No	Yes	Yes

== Basic features ==
Basic features
Feature	Android	iOS	Tizen	Sailfish OS	Ubuntu Touch	HarmonyOS
Cut, copy, and paste	Yes	3+	Yes	Yes	Yes	Yes
Multi-Device clipboard	ChromeOS	10+	No	No	No	Yes
Undo	No	3+	No	No	Yes	Yes
Custom home and lock screen wallpaper	Yes	4+	Yes	Yes (incl. Ambience)	Yes	Yes
Desktop sync	No, but available using the vendor's companion/PC suite application such as Samsung Smart Switch & HTC Sense	Yes	Yes	?	Yes	Yes
Local full backup	Yes, via external computer	Yes, using external computer or iCloud	No	Yes	Yes	Yes, using external computer via HiSuite or Huawei Mobile Cloud
Core data missing sync	Bookmarks (before 4), SMSs and Settings		?	?	?	
Notification center	Yes	5+	2+	Yes	Yes	2.0+
Push notifications	Yes	Yes (Apple Push Notification Service)	2+	Yes	Yes	Yes
Screenshot	4+ also available on earlier versions with customized firmware, such as Cyanogen Mod and on older Samsung Galaxy smartphones	Yes	Yes	2.0.2+	Yes	Yes
Unrestricted Screenshot	No, apps can restrict screenshots	Yes	Yes	Yes	Yes	Yes
iCalendar import	No, but 3rd party app available	Yes	?	1.1.6+	No	Yes
Text/document support (read only; creating using third-party apps)	Microsoft Office, PDF, TXT/RTF	Microsoft Office, iWork, PDF, Images, TXT/RTF, VCF	Read only: text files, PDF, HTML, Multiple office formats	Microsoft Office, OpenDocument, PDF, Text	Yes	Microsoft Office, WPS Office, Huawei Docs, PDF, Images, TXT/RTF, VCF and Multiple office formats
Printer support	4.4+ using Google Cloud Print but not over USB unless proprietary vendor solutions such as HP Print Service are used	Yes (AirPrint)	No	yes, cups package is available	Beta	Yes (Huawei Print, AI Life for HarmonyOS Connect Printers)
Show remembered Wi-Fi connections	Yes	16+	?	Yes	Yes	Yes

== Communication and connectivity ==
Communication and connectivity
Feature	Android	iOS	Tizen	Sailfish OS	Ubuntu Touch	HarmonyOS
Unified Inbox	Yes	Yes	Yes	Yes	?	Yes
Email sync protocols supported	POP3, IMAP, MAPI	POP3, IMAP, MAPI, ActiveSync	POP3, IMAP	POP3, IMAP, ActiveSync	?	POP3, IMAP, MAPI
Non-carrier-based integrated messaging	RCS via Google Messages	5+ (iMessage)	?	3rd party software	3rd party software	3rd party software
Visual voicemail	2.1+	Yes	?	?	?	Yes
Call log duration	Yes	Yes	?	Yes	Yes	Yes
Multiple mobile phones per contact	Yes	Yes	?	Yes	Yes	Yes
Contact groups	4+ or 3rd party software	Via iCloud or 3rd party software	Yes	No	?	Yes
Voice over IP	Yes (SIP) or 3rd party software	FaceTime; 3rd party software	No	3rd party software	3rd party software	MeeTime; 3rd party software
NFC payment software	Available on any device that supports the hardware. Google Wallet for NFC payments available in Play Store. 3rd party banking and other apps in the financial field also supported.	8+: iPhone 6/6 Plus and later (iPhone 5 and later if used with Apple Watch), limited to Apple Pay	Samsung Pay	No	No	Huawei Pay
Tethering	Mobile Wi-Fi Hotspot, USB, Bluetooth	4.3+: Personal Hotspot (Wi-Fi, Bluetooth, USB; carrier dependent)	microUSB, Bluetooth 3.0, Mobile Wi-Fi Hotspot	Mobile Wi-Fi Hotspot, USB, Bluetooth	Mobile Wi-Fi Hotspot	Mobile Wi-Fi Hotspot, USB, Bluetooth
USB On-The-Go	3.1+	13+; 9+: Only for connecting cameras	No	Yes	Yes	Yes
Direct file transfer over Wi-Fi Direct	4+ and selected devices. Also Quick Share.	No, 3rd party software on jailbroken devices	No, was available on bada 2+, but removed on Tizen	No	No	Yes
Direct file transfer over Bluetooth	2+. Also Quick Share.	AirDrop: 7+: Between iOS only; 8+: Between Mac/iOS only. (Note: AirDrop utilizes Wi-Fi as well)	No, was available on bada, but removed on Tizen	Yes but limited to images, videos and contacts	No	Huawei Share
Direct file transfer over NFC	No, removed since Android 10	No	2+	No	No	No

== Language and inputs ==
Language and inputs
Feature	Android	iOS	Tizen	Sailfish OS	Ubuntu Touch	HarmonyOS
Non-English languages support	Partial	Yes	Limited (Search is not diacritical mark-insensitive)	Yes	Yes	Yes
Underlining spell checker	2.3+	Yes	No	?	No	Yes
Built-in system-wide dictionary	Built into keyboard app. Available on every device.	5+	No	Yes	Yes	No
Autoexpanding text replacements	Yes	5+	?	?	?	Yes
Keyboard next word prediction	Yes, through the built in Gboard or from the preinstalled vendor keyboards; Available on all devices	8+	No	Yes	Yes	Yes
Keyboard cursor controller	Google Keyboard;	12+; 9-11: Only on devices with 3D Touch;	No	No	Yes	No
Optical character recognition input method	Yes, through built-in Google Lens or Bixby Vision	15+; 11+: Notes app; 8+: Only for inputting credit card details	No	No	No	Yes
Third party input methods	Yes	8+	?	?	?	Yes
Gesture text input	4+	13+; 8+: 3rd party software like SwiftKey	?	No	No	Yes
Emoji support	4.4+	Yes	?	2.2.0+ 3rd party software	Yes	Yes

== Maps and navigation ==
Maps and navigation
Feature	Android	iOS	Tizen	Sailfish OS	Ubuntu Touch	HarmonyOS
Safe driving mode	3rd party software	11+	?	?	?	2.0+
Turn-by-turn navigation	2+	6+	?	Yes	3rd party software	Yes
Offline maps	3rd party software Google Maps, Here WeGo	6+	?	3rd party software	3rd party software	Yes
Alternative routes in maps	Yes	5+	?	3rd party software	3rd party software	Yes

== Media playback and controls ==
Media playback and controls
Feature	Android	iOS	Tizen	Sailfish OS	Ubuntu Touch	HarmonyOS
Audio playback	AAC LC/LTP 3GPP, HE-AACv1 (AAC+), HE-AACv2 (enhanced AAC+) AMR-NB, AMR-WB, MP3, MIDI (Type 0 and 1, DLS versions 1 and 2), Ogg Vorbis, PCM/WAVE, FLAC, WAVE, OpusSome distributions support others, like Dolby AC-3, AC-4	AAC, protected AAC (from iTunes Store), HE-AAC, MP3, MP3 VBR, Audible (formats 2, 3, 4, Audible Enhanced Audio, AAX, and AAX+), Apple Lossless, AIFF, WAV	AAC, AAC+, eAAC+, AMR-NB, AMR-WB, MP3, Vorbis, WAV	MP3, FLAC, AAC, eAAC, eAAC+, ALAC, AC3, DTS, Opus, Vorbis	Most using GStreamer	AAC LC/LTP 3GPP, HE-AACv1 (AAC+), HE-AACv2 (enhanced AAC+) AMR-NB, AMR-WB, MP3, MIDI (Type 0 and 1, DLS versions 1 and 2), Ogg Vorbis, PCM/WAVE, FLAC, WAVE, Opus
Video playback	H.263, H.264 (up to Baseline Profile), H.265 HEVC, MPEG-4 SP, DivX, XviD, VP8, VP9 (WMV on 3rd party software like VLC media player)	H.264 (up to High Profile), MPEG-4, M-JPEG	H.263, H.264, MPEG-4 Part 2	MPEG-4, H264, H263, although audio in recorded videos is out of sync	Most using GStreamer	H.263, H.264 (up to Baseline Profile), H.265 HEVC, MPEG-4 SP, DivX, XviD, VP8, VP9 (WMV on 3rd party software like VLC media player)
Wired video out	4K on 6+	Up to 1080p via HDMI or VGA, 576p/480p via component or composite;	No	No	Yes	
Wired digital audio output	5+ USB Audio	7+: USB Audio	No	No	Yes	Yes up to 4K
Wireless video/audio streaming to set top boxes/TVs/speakers	4.2+ Miracast, but DLNA only available on selected devices	AirPlay	DLNA	?	Yes	Yes on Wireless Projection with Miracast
Media player on-device playlist creation	Yes	Yes	?	Yes	Yes	Yes
Media player video scrubbing	Yes	Yes	?	?	Yes	Yes
Media player audio scrubbing	Yes	Yes	?	?	Yes	Yes
Media player fine scrubbing	No, 3rd party software like VLC media player, basic fine scrubbing removed on 4+	Yes	?	?	Yes	Yes
Media player double speed playing	6+	Only Podcasts	?	?	Yes	Yes

== Peripheral support ==
Peripheral support
Feature	Android	iOS	Tizen	Sailfish OS	Ubuntu Touch	HarmonyOS
Bluetooth keyboard	2.3+; previous versions via 3rd party software	Yes	No	Yes	Yes	Yes
USB keyboard	3.1+	With Camera Connection Kit	No	Yes	Yes	Yes
Interchangeable external memory cards	Yes	Only for photo/video import with an optional accessory	Yes	Yes	Yes	Yes

== Photo and video ==
Photo and video
Feature	Android	iOS	Tizen	Sailfish OS	Ubuntu Touch	HarmonyOS
Camera focus at specified point	2.3+	Yes	?	1.0.4+	Yes	Yes
Camera exposure metering from specified point	No, available on some phones.	Yes	No	?	No	Yes
On device picture info (including Exif data)	Only date and location; more with 3rd party software	Yes (15+);previous versions date and location only; more with 3rd party software	No	?	Yes	Yes
On device picture categorization	No 3rd party software like TouchWiz	5+	No	?	No	Yes
On device picture description and search	No	10+: Items/objects in picture; 7+: Only date and location	No	?	No	Yes
Turn off shutter sound	In silent mode	In silent mode	In silent mode	In silent mode	No	Yes
Picture crop	Yes	5+	No	Yes	Yes	Yes
Photo rotation	Yes	5+	No	Yes	Yes	Yes
Photo red-eye reduction	2.3+	5+	No	No	No	Yes
HDR photos option	4.2+, some manufacturers earlier	Yes	No	No	Yes	Yes
Photo/video import from memory cards	Yes	With Camera Connection Kit	Yes	Yes	Yes	Yes
Video trim	2.3+	Yes	No	?	No	Yes

== Productivity ==
Productivity
Feature	Android	iOS	Tizen	Sailfish OS	Ubuntu Touch	HarmonyOS
Multitasking	Yes	7+; 4–6: Limited	2+	Yes	Yes	Yes
Quick app switching	7+	9+: via 3D Touch; 5+: only on iPad	No	No	Yes	Yes
Document-centric multitasking	5+	13+: can open different views of same app side by side	No	No	No	2.0+
Split-screen app usage	7+, some manufacturers earlier	9+: only on iPad with 2 GB RAM or more	Yes	No	Tablet-only	2.0+
Desktop interactive widgets	Yes	10+: App icons via 3D Touch and/or dedicated widget screen	No	Yes	No	2.0+
Lock screen widgets	Yes (Notifications and settings). Full Widgets on Android 4.2–4.4 only.	Media player, voicemail, camera; 5+: Notifications; 7+: Control Center; 8+: Interactive Notifications; 10+: Full widgets	Media player; Notifications (SMS, call)	Yes	No	2.0+ Yes & Quick service widgets
Notification view widgets	4.1+: Google Now and possible with 3rd party apps	8+	No	Yes	No	4.0+ Live Window widgets
Quick settings toggles	2+	7+	No	Via the Patchmanager app	Yes	Yes
Search multiple internal apps at once	Yes	Yes	Yes	No	Yes	Yes
Settings search	5+ or 3rd party software like LineageOS	9+	No	No	Yes	Yes
Search all fields of internal objects	Only search Contacts name field but not any other field	6+	Only searches contacts by name	?		Yes
Core apps missing search	Calendar (available since 3+ and HTC Sense)	Bookmarks	?	?	?	Yes
Phone number links to dialer	Available in stock Android, but not all devices enable it.	Yes	Yes, but not in browser	Yes	Yes	Yes
Addresses links to maps	In Contacts, but not in Calendar nor in Gmail	Yes	?	Yes	?	Yes
Dates links to calendar	No	Yes	Yes	Yes	?	Yes

== Ringtones and alerts ==
Ringtones and alerts
Feature	Android	iOS	Tizen	Sailfish OS	Ubuntu Touch	HarmonyOS
Custom ringtones	Yes	Yes	Yes	Yes	Yes	Yes
Custom SMS/MMS tones	Yes	5+	?	Yes	No	Yes
Custom vibrate alert patterns	No, possible on some Samsung devices such as Galaxy S III, but limited	5+	?	API available for 3rd party apps	No	No
Dismiss repeating alarm clock before trigger	4.4+	No	No	?	Yes	Yes
Tap to snooze	3rd party apps	Yes	No	Swipe down	Yes	Yes

== Security and privacy ==
Security and privacy
Feature	Android	iOS	Tizen	Sailfish OS	Ubuntu Touch	HarmonyOS
Proxy server	3.1+ but only global, not per connection and only works for the browser 3rd party apps available	Yes	Yes	Yes	No	Only 3rd party apps and Browser
On-device encryption	3+	Yes (3rd party software may attempt brute-force attacks on password)	No	3.3.0+	No	Yes
External storage encryption	6+	External storage not available	No	Yes	No	2.0+
Zero knowledge encryption	Yes, if Google Play Services is installed, data will be accessible by Google and shared with the American PRISM surveillance program.	Some data stored on iCloud is accessible by Apple and shared with the American PRISM surveillance program.	?	?	No	No, data stored on Huawei Mobile Cloud is accessible by Huawei but not shared with the American PRISM surveillance program unlike Google and Apple.
Privacy of synchronization	3rd party software like ownCloud	When synchronizing locally and not using iCloud	?	?	?	When synchronizing locally via HiSuite and not using Huawei Mobile Cloud
Sync to cloud communication encryption	2.3.4+	Yes	?	?	?	Yes with Smart Syncing that uses irreversible encryption
Wireless anti-tracking	Developer Options (9+)	8+	No	?	No	Yes
Remote device location tracking	Yes	Yes	?	?	No	Yes
Remote device locking and/or data wipe	2.2+	Yes	?	?	No	Yes
End-to-end encrypted push notifications	Possible, notifications are handled by the app that can decrypt it	Possible since iOS 7, where the app can handle the notification and decrypt it	?	?	Yes	Possible, notifications are handled by the app that can decrypt it
SSH Client	Yes	Yes	?	Yes	Yes	Yes
VPN	Yes	Yes	?	Yes	Yes	Yes
OpenVPN	Neutral No, but possible with 3rd party applications	Yes	?	Yes	Yes	No, but possible with 3rd party apps
WPA PEAP	Yes	Yes	?	In developer mode	Yes	Yes

== Sound and voice ==
Sound and voice
Feature	Android	iOS	Tizen	Sailfish OS	Ubuntu Touch	HarmonyOS
Separate volume for ringtone and media	Yes	Yes	?	Yes	Yes	Yes
Voice commands	Yes	5+ (Siri)	?	3rd party software, such as Saera	No	Yes
Offline voice commands	6+	Yes	?	No	No	Yes
Voice recognition	Yes	5+ (Siri)	?	No	No	Yes
Offline voice recognition	4.1+	15+;	No	No	No	Yes
Non-English voice recognition	Yes	Yes	?	No	No	Yes
Sound recorder	Very limited (Does not work in background and not voice controlled)	3+: Limited (Not voice controlled)	Partial	3rd party software	3rd party software	Yes
Call recorder	Yes, Phone by Google, but also possible with 3rd party firmware	Yes, integrated in the Phone app, but also possible with 3rd party software	No	Disabled by default, must be interactively switched on during a call when enabled / 3rd party software	?	Yes
Sound trim	No, but 3rd party software available	Yes	?	?	?	Yes

== Other features ==
Other features
Feature	Android	iOS	Tizen	Sailfish OS	Ubuntu Touch	HarmonyOS
Non-intrusive incoming calls	5+ or 3rd party software	14+	No	No	?	Yes
Non-intrusive notifications	Yes	5+	?	?	?	Yes
Move apps to external storage	2.2+	External storage not allowed for apps	No	No	No	No
RFB (VNC)	Yes	3rd party software	?	?	?	3rd party software
Screencast on device	11+	9+	No	No	Yes	Yes
Screencast over USB	4.4+ over USB, for prior versions root required for 3rd party app	8+: on OS X	No	?	No	Yes
Screen share	Yes, with Google Cast, Miracast under Android 5.	3rd party software	No	No	No, but possible with 3rd party software	Yes

== See also ==
- Comparison of open-source mobile phones
- List of custom Android distributions
- Comparison of satellite navigation software
- Mobile operating system
- Linux for mobile devices
