= PWG =

PWG may refer to:

- Pro Wrestling Guerrilla, an American professional wrestling promotion based in Southern California
- Communist Party of India (Marxist-Leninist) People's War, usually called People's War Group (PWG)
- The Printer Working Group
- PWG Raster, an image format created by the Printer Working Group
- The Working Group on Financial Markets, also known as the President's Working Group on Financial Markets
- Proto-West Germanic
