= Google Cloud Print =

Remote printing service run by Google

- Example of printing queue on Google Cloud Print for Android
- Developer: Google
- Initial release: April 16, 2010; 16 years ago
- Operating system: Cross-platform (web-based application, with functionality built into Google Chrome)
- Website: google.com/cloudprint/learn Archived 2020-12-07 at the Wayback Machine

Google Cloud Print was a Google service that allowed users to print from any Cloud Print-aware application (web, desktop, mobile) on any device in the network cloud to any printer with native support for connecting to cloud print services – without Google having to create and maintain printing subsystems for all the hardware combinations of client devices and printers, and without the users having to install device drivers to the client, but with documents being fully transmitted to Google. Starting on July 23, 2013 it allowed printing from any Windows application, if Google Cloud Printer was installed on the machine.

Google Cloud Print was shut down on December 31, 2020.

== Features ==
=== Integration with other Google products ===
Google Cloud Print was integrated into the mobile versions of Gmail and Google Docs, allowing users to print from their mobile devices. Google Chrome 16 and higher listed Google Cloud Print a printer option in the Print Preview page. Google Chrome 9 and higher supported printers without built-in Cloud Print component through a "Cloud Print Connector".

== History ==
Google introduced Cloud Print in April 2010, as a future solution for printing from ChromeOS. They made the design document and a preliminary version of the source code available. Google Cloud Print reached beta stage on 25 January 2011.

Applications print through a web-based, common print dialog (web UI) or an API. The service forwards the job to a printer registered to the service. Cloud Ready printers (which connect directly to the web and do not require a computer to set up) can directly connect to Google Cloud Print. As legacy ("classic") printers cannot accept input from a cloud service, Google Chrome 9 contained a "Cloud Print Connector"—which lets printers plugged into a Microsoft Windows, Apple Mac, or Linux computer with Internet access use Cloud Print while the connector is running in Google Chrome.

Printing through Google Cloud Print from any instance of Google Chrome was enabled in Google Chrome 16.

Beginning in December 2014, Google Cloud Print allowed users to share printers in a manner similar to Google Docs.

In July 2013, Google updated the service to allow printing from any Windows application if Google Cloud Printer is installed on the machine. The Google Cloud Print Service can run as a Windows service, so legacy printers can connect to Google Cloud Print.

Google Cloud Print 2.0, not supported by some printers that support v 1.0, adds support for a local mode similar in operation to Apple's AirPrint. Unlike the earlier version of Cloud Print, v 2.0 does not require either the printer or printing client to be connected to the Internet. Local mode uses a discovery protocol called Privet, which uses Multicast DNS and DNS-SD for discovery, and HTTPS for transmitting print jobs to the printer. Clients supporting this mode only list printers that are discoverable on the same subnet the device is connected to, and forget the printers once disconnected from that subnet.

== Discontinuation ==
In November 2019, Google announced end of support for Google Cloud Print on December 31, 2020. Google cited improvements in native ChromeOS printing as well as a marketplace of other print solutions providers in its decision to terminate the service.

== Privacy ==
Documents printed via Google Cloud Print were sent to Google's servers for transmission to the printer. Google stated that they stored each document queued for printing, "but only for so long as the printing job is active and not complete". And: "Documents you send to print are your personal information and are kept strictly confidential. Google does not access the documents you print for any purpose other than to improve printing."

== See also ==
- Apple AirPrint
- Internet Printing Protocol
- Mopria Alliance
- CUPS
