= Printer port (disambiguation) =

Printer port is the parallel port of a computer, used by printers.

The term may also refer to:

- Port 631, the network port used by remote printers.
- Macintosh RS-422 printer port, also known as the LocalTalk port, a serial port on Apple Macintosh computers from 1985 until 1998 when it was replaced by USB ports, that was used both for direct connection of printers and to connect the computer to a localtalk network.
