= Printer Working Group =

Printer Working Group logo

The Printer Working Group (PWG) is a Program of the IEEE Industry Standard and Technology Organization (ISTO) with members including printer and multi-function device manufacturers, print server developers, operating system providers, print management application developers, and industry experts. Originally founded in 1991 as the Network Printing Alliance, the PWG is chartered to make printers, multi-function devices, and the applications and operating systems supporting them work together better.

The PWG enjoys an open standards development process. Everyone is welcome to contribute to the development of their documents and standards, serve as editors, and participate in interoperability tests. Members may additionally serve as officers in the various working groups. Voting Members approve the documents and standards for publication and may serve as officers of the PWG.

== Workgroups ==
The PWG has two active workgroups: the Internet Printing Protocol workgroup and the Imaging Device Security workgroup.

The Internet Printing Protocol workgroup develops and maintains the Internet Printing Protocol (IPP) and maintains the Printer MIB, Job Monitoring MIB, Finishers MIB, and various PWG-specific MIBs used via the Simple Network Monitoring Protocol (SNMP). IPP is supported by almost all network printers, is the basis of the various driverless printing standards including AirPrint, IPP Everywhere, Mopria, and Wi-Fi Direct Print Services, and is used by various print spoolers including CUPS.

The Imaging Device Security (IDS) workgroup develops and maintains security-related standards and best practices, and has a liaison with the Common Criteria organization in order to develop and maintain the current Hardcopy Device (HCD) Collaborative Protection Profile (cPP).

== History ==
In February 1990, the IETF Network Printing Protocol working group was chartered. In August 1990, the working group published RFC 1179: Line Printer Daemon Protocol to document the prevalent network printing protocol at the time.

In 1991, a consortium of printer and network manufacturers (Insight Development, Intel, LAN Systems, Lexmark and Texas Instruments) formed the Network Printing Alliance (NPA). Later members included QMS, Kyocera, GENICOM, Okidata, Unisys, Canon, IBM, Kodak, Adaptec, Tektronix, Digital Products, Pennant Systems, Extended Systems and NEC.

In 1993, the NPA was reformed as the Printer Working Group and added HP, Compaq, Microsoft, Xerox, Xircom, Farpoint Communications, Zenith, Castelle, Fujitsu, 3M, Cirrus Logic, Amp, National Semiconductor and Ricoh.

In January 1994, the IETF Printer MIB working group was chartered. This working group published a series of SNMP MIB RFCs from 1995 through 2004, at which point development and maintenance of printer-related MIBs transitioned to the Printer Working Group.

In March 1997, the IETF Internet Printing Protocol working group was chartered. This working group published a series of IPP RFCs from 1999 through 2005, at which point development and maintenance of IPP transitioned to the Printer Working Group.

In September 1999, the IEEE formalized an alliance with PWG as part of the IEEE Industry Standards and Technology Organization (IEEE-ISTO). Since then, the PWG has published over 60 standards and informational documents related to printing and printers.

In March 2015, the IETF published a new IPP RFC developed by the PWG IPP workgroup - RFC 7472: IPP over HTTPS Transport Binary and the ipps URI Scheme.

In January 2017, the IETF published updates to the core IPP RFCs (RFC 2910, 2911, 3381, and 3382) developed by the PWG IPP workgroup - RFC 8010: Internet Printing Protocol/1.1: Encoding and Transport and RFC 8011: Internet Printing Protocol/1.1: Model and Semantics. In June 2018, the IETF published these RFCs as Internet Standard 92.
