= Drupa =

Printing equipment exhibition

Coordinates: 51°15′40″N 6°44′35″E

drupa
- Genre: Printing equipment
- Begins: 28 May 2024
- Ends: 7 June 2024
- Frequency: Every 4 years
- Venue: Düsseldorf Fairgrounds
- Locations: Düsseldorf, Germany
- Inaugurated: 1951
- Participants: 1828 from 54 countries (2016)
- Attendance: 260,165 from 183 countries (2016)
- Organiser: Messe Düsseldorf
- Website: www.drupa.com

Drupa (stylized drupa) is the largest printing equipment exhibition in the world, held every four years by Messe Düsseldorf in Düsseldorf, Germany. The word drupa is a portmanteau of the German words Druck und Papier ("print and paper").

Thousands of industry experts are usually present, and corporate representation typically includes companies such as Agfa Graphics, Océ N.V., Muller Martini, EIZO, Esko, HP Inc., Xeikon, Flint Group, Heidelberger Druckmaschinen, Manroland, Kern, Pitney Bowes, New Solution, Xerox, Kodak, Canon, Transeomedia, DirectSmile, Konica Minolta, Ricoh, Martin Automatic, Komori Corporation, Fujifilm, Siegwerk, Inspectron and Koenig & Bauer AG. Several new technologies are typically demonstrated during Drupa.

== Key data ==
| drupa-year | Exhibition space in m² | Visitors from countries | Exhibitors from countries | Highlights | President |
|---|---|---|---|---|---|
| 1951 | 18,450 | 195,185 | 527 from 10 | "Platen Press" with 5,000 printed sheets/h | Hubert Sternberg |
| 1954 | 35,000 | 226,388 | 764 from 13 | Stereotype-engraving machine | Hubert Sternberg |
| 1958 | 43,000 | 185,936 | 688 from 13 | Phototypesetting | Hubert Sternberg |
| 1962 | 48,000 | 180,483 | 678 from 16 | Offset printing | Hubert Sternberg |
| 1967 | 57,785 | 214,694 | 945 from 19 | Stacker | Hubert Sternberg |
| 1972 | 100,789 | 268,713 | 958 from 27 | Small offset printing with 8,000 sheets/h | Kurt Werner |
| 1977 | 99,639 | 284,806 | 1108 from 22 | UV-hardening colors | Kurt Werner |
| 1982 | 104,291 | 293,059 | 1275 from 29 | Web offset printing | Kurt Werner |
| 1986 | 122,711 | 373,656 | 1465 from 33 | Data Exchange | Kurt Werner |
| 1990 | 126,811 | 444,214 | 1760 from 36 | Fully digitized machines and secondary systems | Kurt Werner |
| 1995 | 142,056 | 385,098 | 1670 from 44 | Computer to plate | Hans-Bernhard Bolza-Schünemann |
| 2000 | 158,875 | 428.248 from 171 | 1943 from 50 | Complex solution providers | Albrecht Bolza-Schünemann |
| 2004 | 161,000 | 394.478 from 127 | 1866 from 52 | Networking, Book-on-Demand | Albrecht Bolza-Schünemann |
| 2008 | 175,272 | 389,993 | 1968 from 53 | Digital technologies | Albrecht Bolza-Schünemann |
| 2012 | 165,159 | 314,500 | 1844 from 52 | Hybrid-Technologie, Nano ink, Printed electronics | Bernhard Schreier |
| 2016 | 158,237 | 260,165 from 183 | 1828 from 54 | | Claus Bolza-Schünemann |
| 2024 | 138,773 | 165,551 from 173 | 1614 from 49 | | |

== Theme song ==
Since 2000 every drupa had its own theme song. The idea started in 1986 with a song featuring a country folk style which was later nominated as one of the worst corporate anthems ever by The Register. Nevertheless, they are one of the drupa trademarks since the theme song concept was resurrected with a dance/pop power ballad in 2000. The drupa 2004 theme song used a techno dance style while the song for 2012 was performed by Dirk Zeisler.

== See also ==
- IPEX (UK)
- FESPA (EU, South Africa, Mexico, Brasil, China, Turkey)
