= FlightCheck =

Preflight software for Desktop Publishing

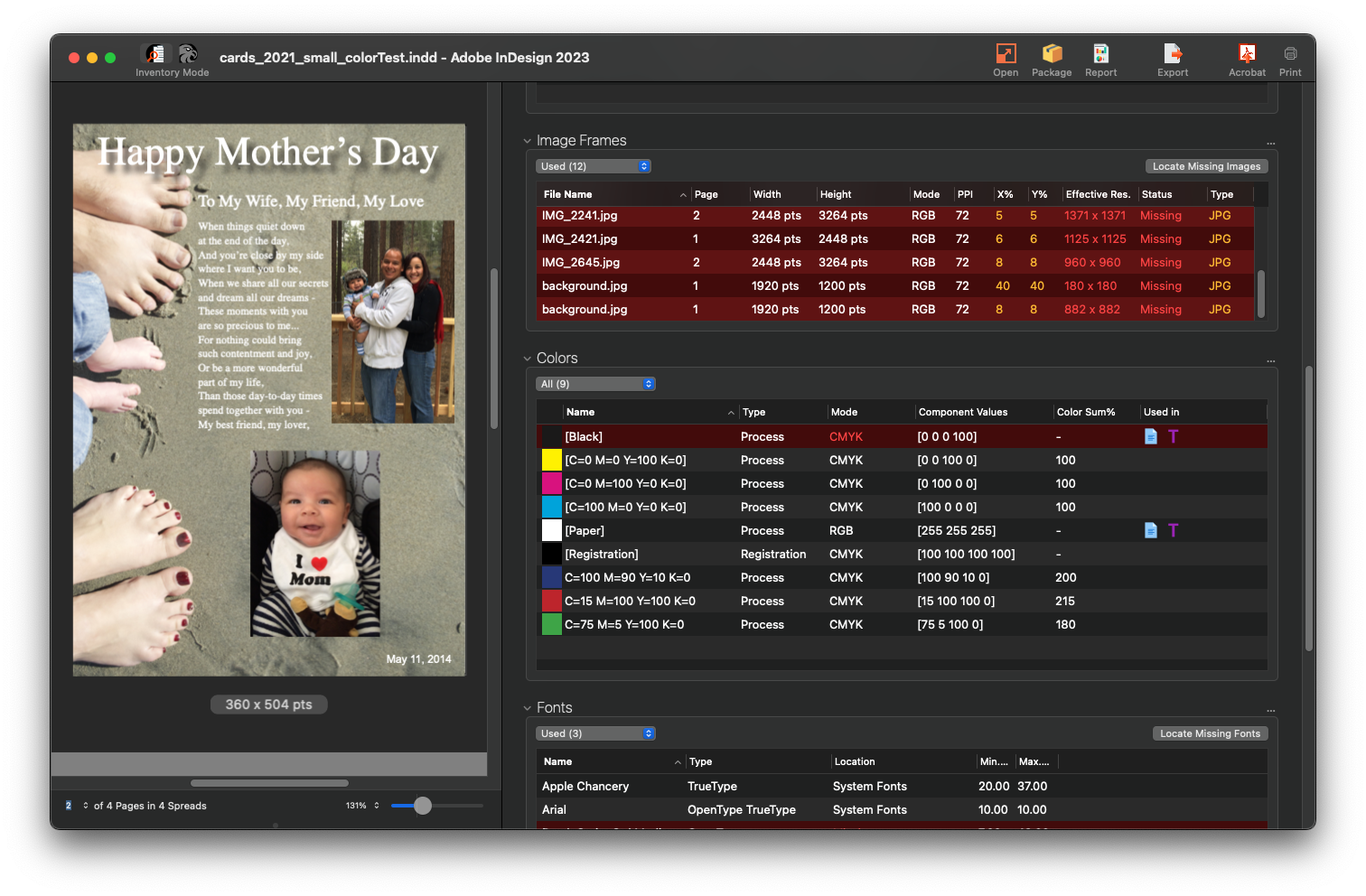
- FlightCheck 2023 running on macOS
- Developer(s): Markzware Inc.
- Initial release: 1995; 30 years ago
- Stable release: 2023 / December 2022; 2 years ago
- Written in: C++, Swift (programming language)
- Operating system: macOS 10.13 and later
- Platform: x86-64, ARM64
- Type: Preflight for Desktop Publishing
- License: Trialware, Proprietary license
- Website: markzware.com/products/flightcheck/

FlightCheck is a stand-alone application that performs preflight quality control inspection on many common file types such as Adobe InDesign, Adobe Photoshop, Adobe Illustrator, QuarkXPress, and PDF.

Preflight in the graphic arts industry is the process of checking a digital document before it goes to the plate, print, or otherwise output (exported - such as to PDF). It is a way to check the quality before printing, digitally or otherwise, but it can also be used to check any common artwork file. Preflight may be done on the source desktop publishing document, or before creating a Portable Document Format (PDF) file. The term preflight was first used during a presentation in 1990 by Chuck Weger, a well-known industry consultant. There were some early postscript RIPs that interpreted data and provided a preflight report of sorts.

The first commercial preflight application, called "FlightCheck," was introduced to the public by Markzware and appeared at the Seybold Seminars Conference at San Francisco in the Fall of 1995. U.S. Patent, number 5,963,641 was subsequently granted - ‘Device and method for examining, verifying, correcting and approving electronic documents prior to printing, transmission or recording.’

Other preflighting tools have subsequently been introduced, mainly focusing on PDF preflighting.
