= Marc Kocher =

Swiss architect

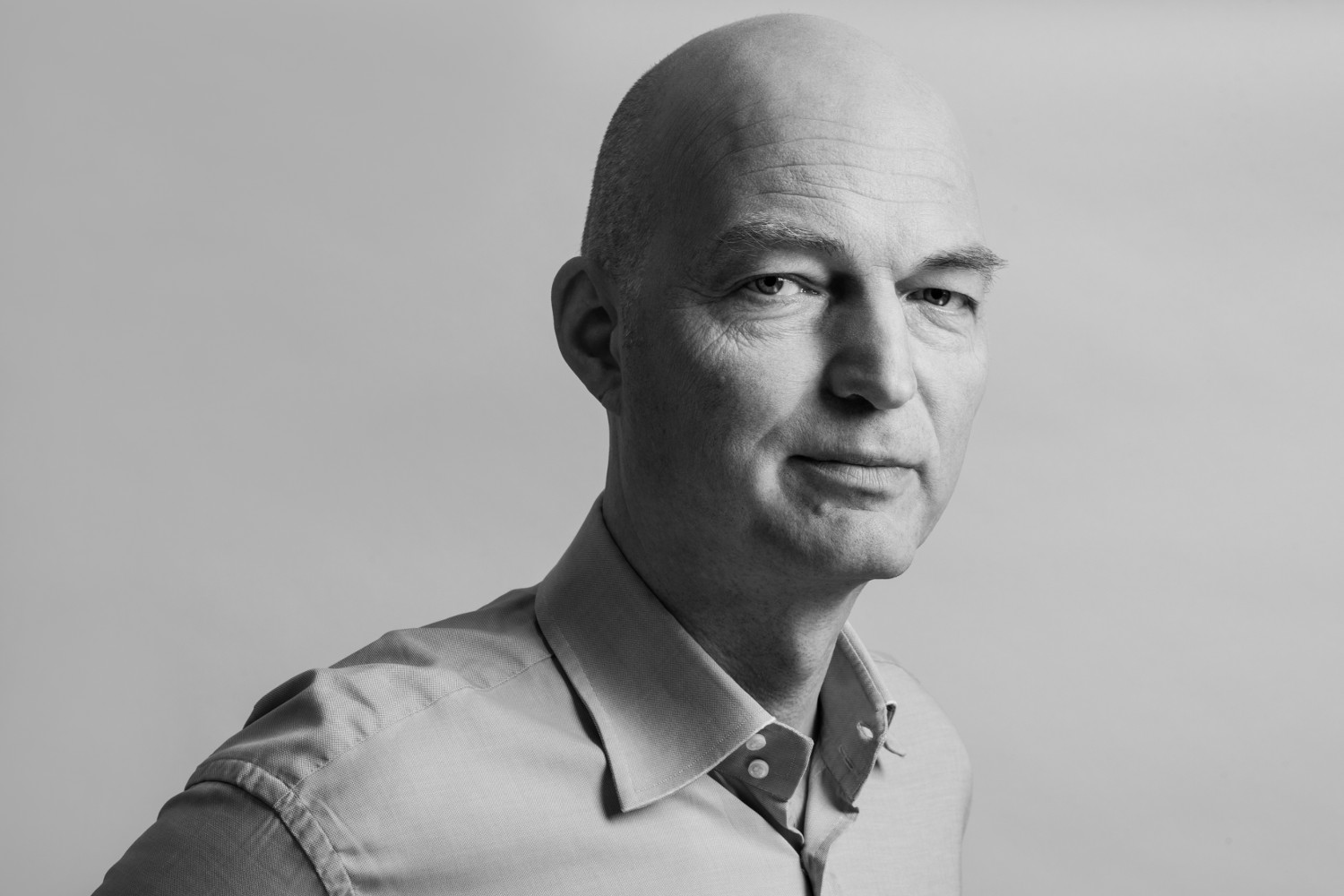
Marc Kocher

Marc Kocher (born 1965) is a Swiss architect, known for his residential building designs.

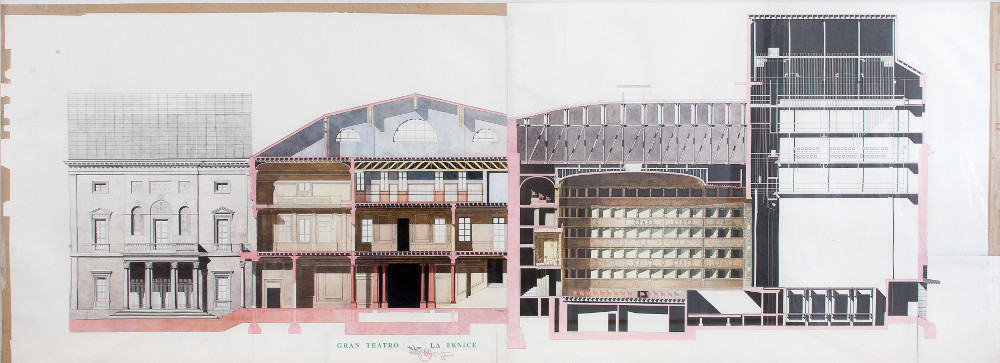
Drawing Gran Teatro La Fenice by Marc Kocher

== Life ==
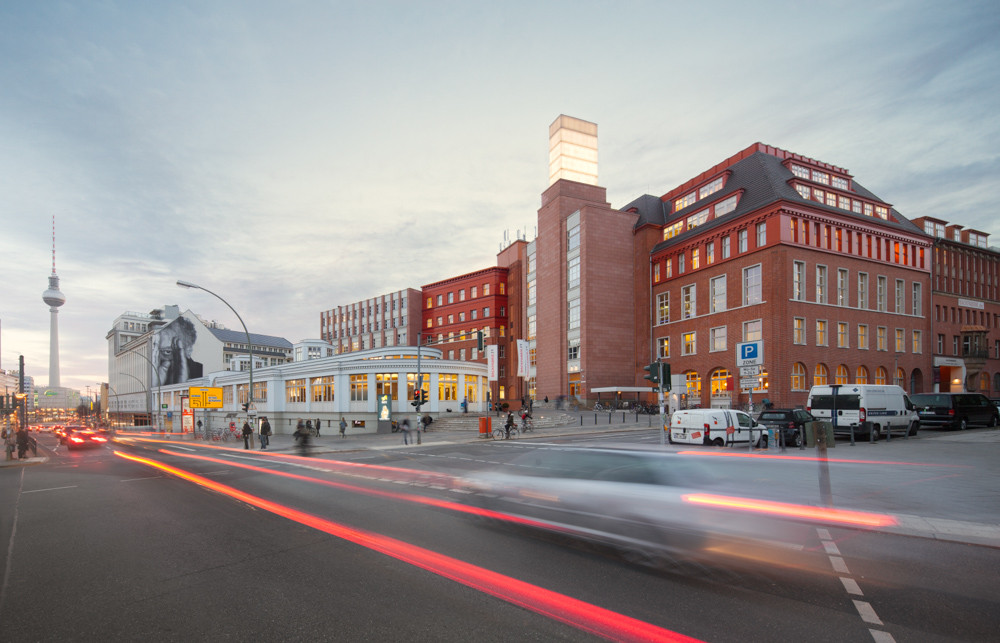
View Prenzlauer Allee Backfabrik Berlin

Kocher was born in 1965 in Bern. Studying architecture at the Swiss Federal Institute of Technology in Zürich (1984-1989), Kocher started working for Italian architect Aldo Rossi in Milan and continued from 1989 until Rossi's death in 1997, becoming Rossi's junior-partner.

In 1995 Kocher founded his own office in Munich, later moving to Zürich (1997).

In 1998/99, Kocher was an assistant at ETH Zürich, and in 1999 and 2000 guest professor at Syracuse University.

In 2012 he opened an office in Berlin.

Kocher lives and works in Berlin and Zürich. He is married and has two children.

== Architectural work ==
Marc Kocher is considered a representative of postmodern neoclassicism as well as New Urbanism architecture, combining contemporary building with elements of classical European urban architecture. Like his teacher Aldo Rossi, Kocher does architectural drawings by hand.

While working with Rossi (1989-1997) Kocher was involved in the design of Milan Linate International Airport's new Terminal, and the Bonnefantenmuseum in Maastricht.

As of 1998, Kocher continued planning the reconstruction of the Venetian opera house Teatro La Fenice, originally commenced by Aldo Rossi. Kocher was responsible for the reconstruction of the interior, especially of the sophisticated wall and ceiling decoration.

In 2000, Kocher was commissioned to transform the Backfabrik, a historic industrial building complex in the Prenzlauer Allee in Berlin, into a modern office and commercial location. In subsequent years, Kocher realized a series of original residential and commercial buildings and refurbished projects for existing structures, primarily in Berlin, but also in Austria, Switzerland and Italy.

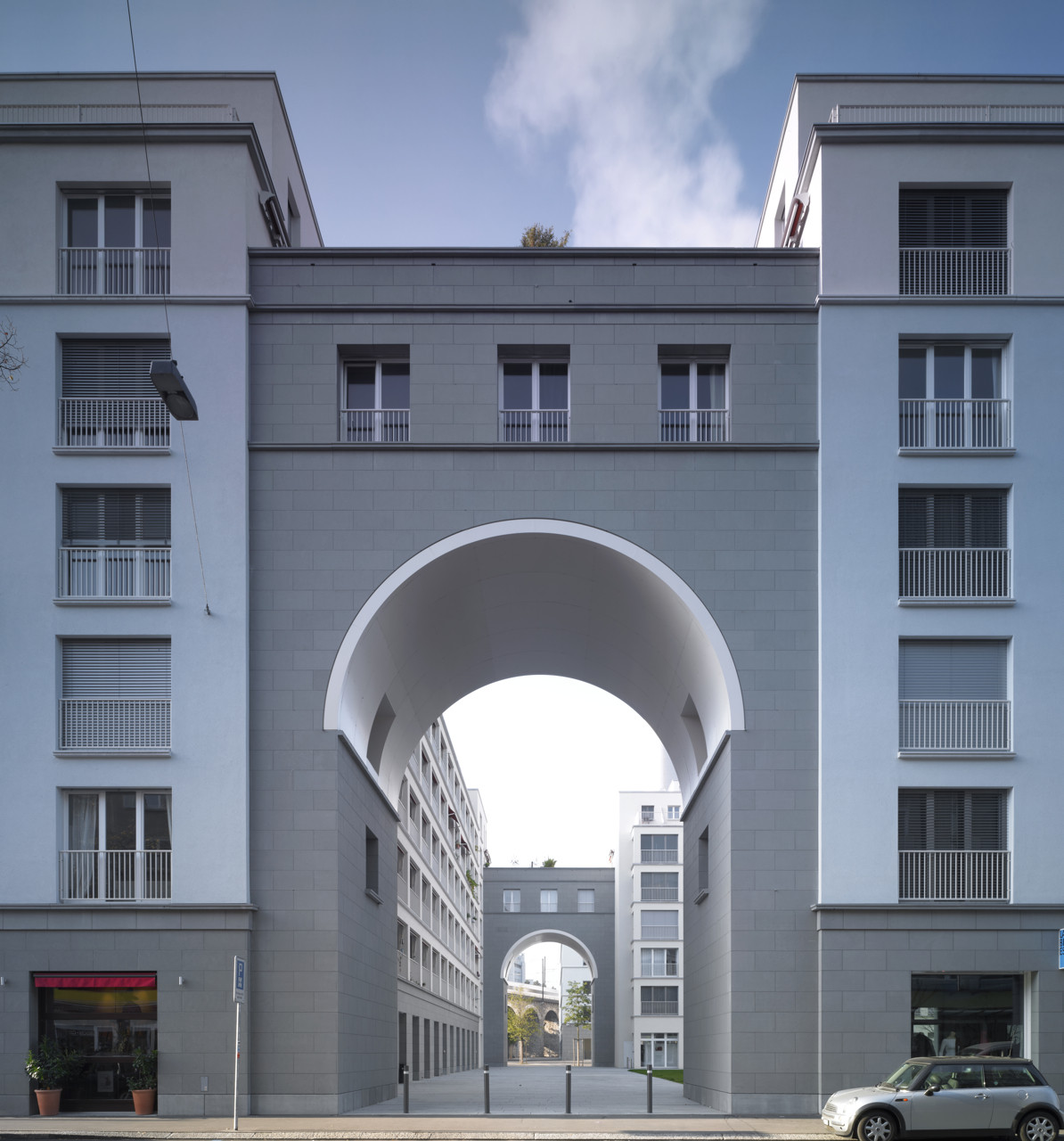
Development Müller Martini (Zürich), Residential and commercial building

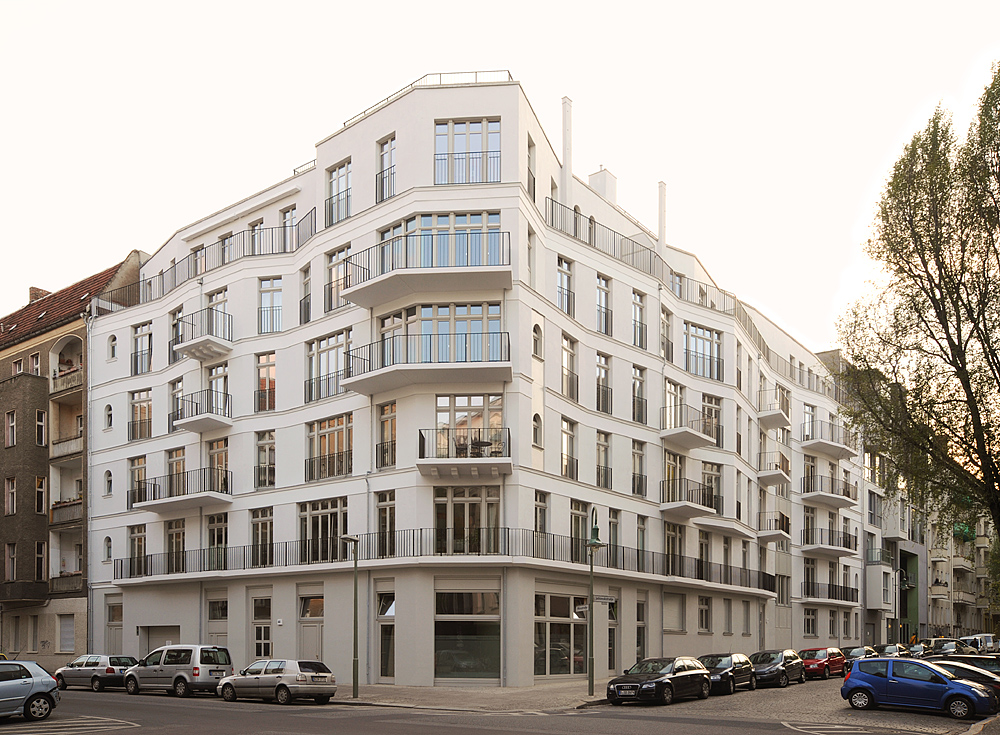
Residential building Jablonskistraße, Berlin

== Selected projects ==
- Linate International Airport, Milan, Italy (1991) - with Aldo Rossi
- Bonnefantenmuseum, Maastricht, Netherlands (1992–94) - with Aldo Rossi
- Commercial building in Dirksenstraße at the corner of Hackescher Markt, Berlin, Germany (1998)
- Office and commercial building Backfabrik, Berlin, Germany (2001)
- Design for reconstruction of Berlin Palace (2002)
- Reconstruction of the Gran Teatro La Fenice, Venice, Italy (2004)
- Residential and commercial building Müller-Martini-Areal, Zürich, Switzerland (2006)
- Residential ensemble "Palais KolleBelle", Berlin, Germany (2009)
- Residential building "Fellini Residences", Berlin, Germany (2013)
- Residential and commercial building Entrée Weißensee, Berlin, Germany (2018)

== Bibliography ==
- Kocher, Marc (1999). Skizzen für ein neues Stadtquartier: das Gelände des ehemaligen Central-Vieh- und Schlachthofes Berlin-Prenzlauer Berg (in German). Berlin: Gebr. Mann Verlag. ISBN 3-7861-2285-7. OCLC 41549142.
- Marc Kocher: Bauten und Projekte, foreword by Prof. Helmut Geisert, Berlin 2019

== Literature ==
- Urban, Florian (2017). The New Tenement. Residences in the Inner City Since 1970. Abingdon-on-Thames, Oxfordshire, England, UK: Routledge. ISBN 978-1138224469.
- Streck, Harald (2015). Neue Stadtbaukultur. Jahrbuch 2014 - Stadtbild Deutschland (in German). Books on Demand. ISBN 978-3734747601.
- Brelowski, Cornelia (2021). "Marc Kocher Architekten: DEFINED DIVERSITY". Discover Germany. No. 86. London, UK: Scan Client Publishing. pp. 28–31.
