= Pre-flight =

Pre-flight or preflight may refer to:

- Preflight checklist, a list of tasks that should be performed by pilots and aircrew prior to takeoff
- Preflight (printing), by analogy with the above
- Preflight (EP), a 2002 EP by Building 429
- Preflight request, a request made web browsers before performing certain cross-origin resource sharing requests
