= JDF =

The term JDF may refer to:

== Military ==
- Jamaica Defence Force
- Japan Self-Defense Forces

== Other ==
- JDF (Job Definition Format) - Workflow automation standard for print production.
- Juvenile Diabetes Research Foundation, formerly known as the Juvenile Diabetes Foundation

== People ==
- Jason David Frank, American actor and martial artist.
