= Muller Martini =

Swiss printing equipment manufacturer

- Type: Private
- Industry: Printing, Graphic Arts Print Finishing
- Founded: 1946
- Headquarters: Zofingen, Switzerland
- Area served: Global
- Key people: Bruno Müller (CEO) Martin Wipfli (Chairman of the Board)
- Products: Bookbinding equipment
- Number of employees: 1300
- Website: http://www.mullermartini.com

The Swiss Muller Martini Group, headquartered in Zofingen, is active in the development, manufacture and marketing of a wide range of print finishing systems.

The individual group companies are organized under the umbrella of Muller Martini Holding AG, based in Hergiswil/Switzerland. The globally active family business employs around 1,300 people and has production facilities in Switzerland, Germany and the USA.

The founder Hans Müller started manufacturing bookbinding equipment in 1946 under the name Grapha Maschinenfabrik. The first machine produced was a hand-fed saddle stitcher, later modernized by the “Swiss Girl” automatic feeder, which could be disengaged and tilted back when not in use. Grapha exhibited its first fully automatic saddle stitcher with an in-line trimmer at Drupa in 1954. During the same time, the company was working on the development of a perfect binder.

In 1955, the company incorporated and changed its name to Grapha Maschinenfabrik Hans Müller A. G. That same year Muller sold its first machine in the United States. Other equipment was added, and in 1961 large-scale production of newspaper and magazine inserting machines was started. As Muller expanded, new manufacturing, sales, and service facilities were set up abroad. A United States subsidiary, the Hans Muller Corp. was established in 1967.

Martini joined the Muller organization in 1969. Founded by Friedrich von Martini, inventor of a precision rifle, Martini began manufacturing folding and stitching machines in 1850. Martini introduced its Book Sewing Machine in 1897, and more than 10,000 have been produced to date. The Martini automobile, powered by a Martini-designed internal combustion engine, was also introduced in 1897. Automobile production stopped in 1934, when the company decided to concentrate on book binding equipment. Adhesive binding machines were developed by Martini in 1941.

Muller Martini developed its first offset web press for business forms in 1972 and was a manufacturer of web presses for direct mail promotional graphics and commercial work. In 1973, Muller Martini USA offices relocated to Hauppauge, Long Island. At the same time, the company name was changed to Muller Martini Corp. A network of sales, product management, and service personnel were also established throughout the United States with Regional Offices in the Atlanta, Chicago, and San Francisco areas.

In the United States, Muller Martini started its first manufacturing facility in 1973 to produce bindery and mailroom equipment in Newport News, VA. This plant has been expanded in several steps and today is over 290,000 sq ft (27,000 m^{2}), used for automated manufacturing as well as assembly, engineering, and new product development.

In 1989, Daverio in Switzerland and KJ in Denmark became part of the Muller Martini, with the ability to produce and market complete newspaper inserting, press finishing, and bindery systems, including conveyors and packaging lines for automatic production.

GMA, located in Allentown, Pennsylvania, a supplier of newspaper mailroom systems to the United States market, was acquired by the Muller Martini group of companies in 1992. GMA was renamed Muller Martini Mailroom Systems.

Muller Martini took over the manufacture of the VBF product line of case binding machines for hard cover book production in 1998. Manufacturing was moved to a new factory with its own training center in Bad Mergentheim, Germany, within 2 years. In 2007 VBF became Muller Martini Book Technology GmbH. As of January 2002, Muller Martini USA assumed marketing and customer service support for all VBF machines in the United States, along with casemakers made by Hoerauf.

In 1991, Hans Müller Sr. transferred the overall responsibility of the Swiss-based company to his son Rudolf Müller, who now holds the position of CEO.

Current company development

2004: Muller Martini founded a new business segment "On Demand Solutions", now named "Digital Solutions". The Division was developed to provide commercial quality finishing to the Digital Book Production market.

2008: Introduction of the new generation of machines in the identity-forming color Laserblue

2009: Change at the top: Rudolf Müller takes over as Chairman of the Board of Directors and Bruno Müller becomes the new CEO

2013: Company founder Hans Müller, a pioneer in the graphic arts industry, passes away at the age of 96

2013: Announcement of a major corporate reform to adapt to the rapidly changing market environment in the graphic arts industry, closing of the site in Felben/Switzerland

2014: In November, the company announces that the production of printing presses will be discontinued. On December 1, Muller Martini takes over service responsibility for Heidelberg saddle stitchers and perfect binders

2018: At the end of January, Muller Martini takes over the bookbinding division recently spun off from Kolbus GmbH & Co. KG and the associated 250 employees of the main Kolbus plant in Rahden (Westphalia).

2020: Muller Martini sells MM Druckmaschinen GmbH in Maulburg/Germany to the Goebel Group

2020: Muller Martini Druckverarbeitungs-Systeme AG takes over Muller Martini Electronic AG

2021: Muller Martini closes its site in Bad Mergentheim/Germany

2023: Muller Martini takes over Hunkeler AG in Wikon/Switzerland

== Products ==
- Saddle Stitching
- Softcover Production
- Hardcover Production
- Digital Solutions

== Production facilities ==
Muller Martini has production facilities in Switzerland and Germany.

- Muller Martini AG, Zofingen (Switzerland)
- Muller Martini Maschinen & Anlagen AG, Hasle and Stans (Switzerland)
- Muller Martini Buchbindetechnologie GmbH, Rahden (Germany)

== See also ==
- MAN Roland
- Heidelberger Druckmaschinen
