= Tim Wilkerson =

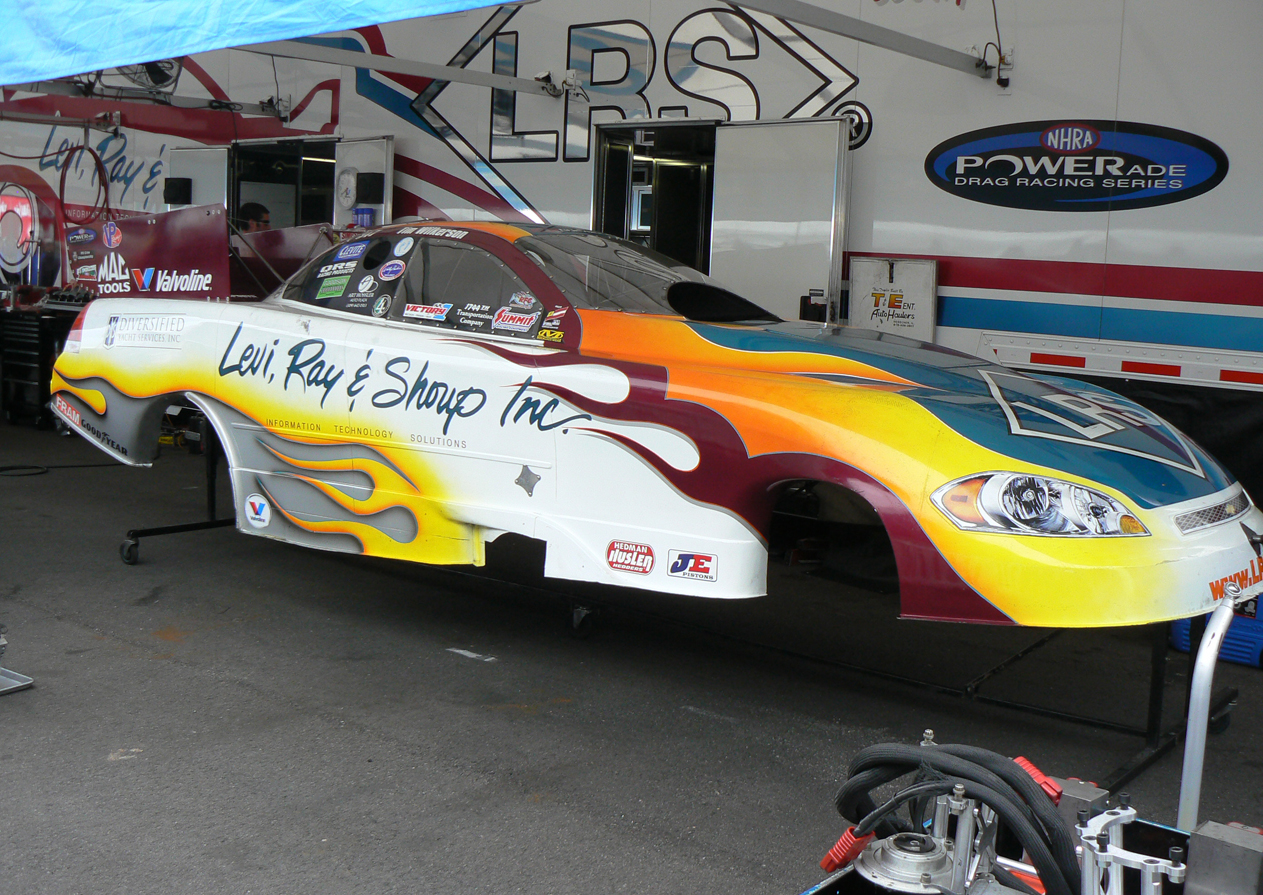
- Wilkerson's 2008 Levi, Ray, & Shoup Chevrolet Impala body
- Nationality: American (United States)
- Born: December 29, 1960 (age 65) Springfield, Illinois, United States

National Hot Rod Association career
- Debut season: 1996
- Current team: Levi, Ray, & Shoup/Wilkerson Racing
- Car number: FC347
- Wins: 24 (21 FC, 3 TAFC)
- Fastest laps: 3.844 seconds & 333.74 mph
- Best finish: 2nd in 2008

Previous series
- 1990 - 1995: NHRA Top Alcohol Funny Car

Championship titles
- 1994, 1995: NHRA Division III Alcohol Funny Car

Tim Wilkerson (born December 29, 1960, in Springfield, Illinois) is a retired NHRA drag racer. He graduated from Southeast High School in Springfield, Illinois and earned an Associate's in Science in civil engineering from Lincoln Land Community College. He is married to Krista and has three children, Daniel (2007 NHRA Division 3 Top Alcohol Funny Car Champion), Kevin, and Rachel. He owns Wilkerson's Service Center and Capital City Machine Shop in Springfield.

== Early career ==
Wilkerson raced an alcohol funny car from 1990 to 1995. He won back to back NHRA Division 3 Top Alcohol Funny Car Championships in 1994 and 1995.

== Nitro Funny Car ==
Wilkerson began his national Nitro Funny Car career in 1996. He was the first funny car rookie to run over 300 mph and the first funny car rookie in the 4s. He went to his first Nitro Funny Car final at the NHRA US Nationals in 1997. He finished seventh in points in 1998. Wilkerson won his first race in Joliet, Illinois in 1999. On September 7, 2003, he won the famed US Nationals. He also won in Reading, Pennsylvania on October 5, 2003. In 2004 he won two races one in Houston, Texas and one in Sonoma, California. In 2006 he ran his career best speed of 330.47 mph. He ran his career best elapsed time of 4.723 in 2007 and he finished 15th in the season points.

In 2008, Wilkerson won six races: Las Vegas, Nevada; Madison, Illinois; Englishtown, New Jersey; Denver, Colorado; Dallas, Texas; and Memphis, Tennessee. He led the NHRA Nitro Funny Car points standings until the 15th event late in the season. He led the Countdown to the Championship and started at the top of the season-ending championship. He went to the final points event second in points and lost the championship to Cruz Pedregon.
