= Job Definition Format =

JDF
- Internet media type: application/vnd.cip4-jdf+xml
- Developed by: CIP4
- Latest release: 1.8; 23 May 2024; 2 years ago
- Type of format: Digital print
- Extended from: XML
- Website: www.cip4.org

JDF (Job Definition Format) is a technical standard developed by the graphic arts industry to facilitate cross-vendor workflow implementations of the application domain. It is an XML format about job ticket, message description, and message interchange. JDF is managed by CIP4, the International Cooperation for the Integration of Processes in Prepress, Press and Postpress Organization. JDF was initiated by Adobe Systems, Agfa, Heidelberg and MAN Roland in 1999 but handed over to CIP3 at Drupa 2000. CIP3 then renamed itself CIP4.

The initial focus was on sheetfed offset and digital print workflow, but has been expanded to web(roll)-fed systems, newspaper workflows and packaging and label workflows.

It is promulgated by the prepress industry association CIP4, and is generally regarded as the successor to CIP3's Print Production Format (PPF) and Adobe Systems' Portable Job Ticket Format (PJTF).

The JDF standard is at revision 1.8. The process of defining and promulgating JDF began circa 1999. The standard is in a fairly mature state; and a number of vendors have implemented or are in the process of implementing it. JDF PARC, a multivendor JDF interoperability demonstration, was an event at the 2004 Drupa print industry show, and featured 21 vendors demonstrating, or attempting to demonstrate interoperability between a total of about forty pairs of products.

JDF is an extensible format. It defines both JDF files and JMF, a job messaging format based on XML over HTTP. In practice, JDF-enabled products can communicate with each other either by exchanging JDF files, typically via "hot folders", or the net or by exchanging JMF messages over the net.

As is typical of workflow applications, the JDF message contains information that enables each "node" to determine what files it needs as input and where they are found, and what processes it should perform. It then modifies the JDF job ticket to describe what it has done, and examines the JDF ticket to determine where the message and accompanying files should be sent next.

The goal of CIP4 and the JDF format is to encompass the whole life cycle of a print and cross-media job, including device automation, management data collection and job-floor mechanical production process, including even such things as bindery, assembly of finished products on pallets.

In addition, there is a huge amount of large-capital production machinery already existing in the trade which is incompatible with JDF. The graphic arts business is shrinking yearly and any large-capital decision is much more a risk than in previous years. The underlying incentive to adopt JDF is not sufficient in most cases to cause owners to abandon "acceptable" machinery that they presently have in favour of a large-capital purchase of somewhat faster, JDF-compliant capital goods. This is especially true in markets where large amounts of non-compliant production machinery are being sold in the used-equipment market and auction sales at considerable reductions in price from new equipment.

== For printing proofing ==
=== Introduction to proofing ===
Before describing the implementation of proofing in JDF, it's better to know a little about the terminology that will be used.

1. Proofing: the process of producing a printed output on a device (proofer) that emulates the best it can the supposed printed output on press (the final production device that can be a conventional press, a digital press…) where the final printed product will be produced. Prepress proofing (or off-press proofing) provide a visual copy without creating a press proof (the process is cheaper).
2. Soft proofing: the same as proofing, but the proofer is actually a screen.
3. Approval: the process of approving or rejecting the proofing (or the soft proofing). Comments and annotations may be added to describe the reasons of the decision and to give instructions on what changes to do.

The original input files have to be processed to be printed on the final press (interpreting, rendering, screening, color management....) and the same to be printed on the proofer (different characteristics). The decision on which of the processing steps will be executed once (common both for printing on the proofer and on the press) and which not will depend on many parameters (characteristics of the proofer device, user requirements, workflow requirements…). The proofing has to take in account the consistency between the press and the proofer.

=== Proofing in JDF ===
In JDF 1.1, proofing and soft proofing were defined as an atomic process on which the input were all the parameters required for a successful process. This has some drawbacks:

1. Lack of flexibility: the semantics is specific for one workflow therefore limited to the definition of the processes and the resources that it can take as input.
2. Lack of control: it is difficult to define the input resources with all the information required for control.
3. Duplication: similar information has to be used to define both proofing and printing. If different resources are used, this will result in duplication.

From JDF 1.2 proofing and soft proofing were deprecated in behalf of a combined process to specify the proofing workflow. The job ticket explicitly defines the processing and provides the flexibility to implement them in different workflows. In order to do that, the atomic processes were made capable of keeping all the information necessary to specify different configurations/options.

=== Combined processes for proofing ===
It is impossible to describe proofing by a unique combination of processes which in turn will depend on the capabilities of the RIPs (Raster image processor), the devices used for proofing and the proofing production workflow. It is still possible to define a generic combined process for the proofing. This will allow it to describe its step in a workflow. The generic combined proofing process combines the following JDF processes:

- ColorSpaceConversion (1): converts the contents of the input RunList from the input color spaces to the color model of the press.
- Interpreting: interprets the input RunList file(s) and converts them to an internal display list in order to go through the Rendering.
- Rendering: renders the raster data.
- Screening: screens the raster data.
- ColorSpaceConversion (2): converts the data from the press color model to the proofer device color model.
- Imposition: if imposition proofing is done, combines the pages and marks on the imposed sheets.
- ImageSetting: specifies the actual printing of the proof. Depending on the characteristics of the proofing device DigitalPrinting can be used as well.

The ordering is not completely strict (same result may be achieved with different order combination of steps), but there are some precedence rules: the first color space conversion must be done before the second one, rendering must be done after interpreting, screening in turn must be done after rendering and the second color conversion, ImageSetting/DigitalPrinting must be done after screening.

=== Combined processes for soft proofing ===
Compared to proofing, since no printed proof is produced, no ImageSetting/DigitalProofing processes are required. Moreover, the rendered data is sent directly to the Approval process that must implement a user interface to show those data on the display and allow him/her to approve/reject the proof and eventually annotate it using digital signature. All the ordering consideration are still valid.

=== Considerations on JDF atomic processes ===
==== ColorSpaceConversion ====
In a production workflow with proofing, there must be both the conversion of the input asset color spaces to the press color space and the one of press color space to the proofer color space. So in JDF two different ColorSpaceConversion processes are required and depending on the exact workflow and on the capabilities of the devices, they can be included in the same combined process.

==== Interpreting and rendering ====
Input data to the proofing combined process usually required both interpreting (with the exception of JDF ByteMap) and rendering. In these cases they will be included in the combined process describing the proofing step.

==== Screening ====
Two possibilities:

- Proofer can emulate the screening of the press: Screening should be performed once at the ripping combined process and the halftoned data should be sent directly to the proofing combined process.
- Proofer is a "contone proofer": one Screening process for the press and one for the proofer.

==== ImageSetting/Digital Printing ====
For printing the proof ImageSetting/DigitalPrinting process has to be specified at the end of the proofing combined process in order to define how the proof is actually printed.

==== Approval ====
Must be executed before the final production printing can be started.

=== HP example: cutting of proofing time ===
HP incorporates JDF into its proofing products. Even if it's only one step in the total process JDF cuts time from the printing process making printers more efficient because proofing traditional generation and delivery of proofs can take days.

HP sends PDF files to a remote proofing. JDF file enables the inclusion of job information (color profiles, job ticket details...) that is sent to the client. In the future marking up the proof and digital signatures for approval will be implemented.

== See also ==
- CUPS
- Internet Printing Protocol
- PPML (Personalized Print Markup Language)
- Workflow management system
