= Levi, Ray & Shoup =

American technology company

Levi, Ray & Shoup, Inc.
- Type: Private
- Industry: Computer software IT consulting Website design and hosting IT education, training and certification Computer hardware IT services Large boat services
- Founded: September 21, 1979; 47 years ago
- Founder: Richard H. Levi; Roger Ray; Bob Shoup
- Headquarters: 2401 West Monroe Street, Springfield, Illinois, US
- Key people: Richard H. Levi, President and CEO
- Owner: Richard H. Levi
- Number of employees: 630 (September 2013)
- Divisions: EOM; LRS Consulting Services; LRS IT Solutions; LRS Retirement Solutions; LRS Web Solutions; LRS Education Services; Central Illinois Security; Diversified Yacht Services
- Website: www.lrs.com

Levi, Ray & Shoup, Inc. (LRS) is a privately held, multinational corporation headquartered in Springfield, Illinois that develops and sells computer software and provides information technology services through various product divisions.

== History ==
LRS was founded on September 21, 1979 by independent consultants Dick Levi, Roger Ray, and Bob Shoup. Levi eventually bought out his partners: Shoup in 1980, and Ray in 1993.

The company built its current headquarters in 1988. At the time, it had 37 employees. In 1998, the company had grown to 400 employees.

In 2019, LRS had 850 employees across 24 offices. About 361 employees were working at company headquarters, making LRS one of Springfield, IL’s largest private employers.

LRS acquired Pennington & Schurter Information Services, Inc. of Morton, Illinois, and Springfield-based Integrated Business Systems, Inc. (IBSI) in 1995; MacKenzie & Roth, Inc. of St. Louis in 1999; Capella Technologies, based in Anaheim, CA, in 2013; Stockholm, Sweden-based software company Cirrato Technologies AB in 2016; and US-based Drivve Inc. in 2018.

== Offices ==
Domestic LRS offices are located in Bloomington, Illinois; Glastonbury, Connecticut; St. Louis, Missouri; Atlanta, Georgia; Cedar Rapids, Iowa; Overland Park, Kansas; Richardson, Texas; Franklin, Tennessee; and Anaheim, California.

International LRS offices are located in Paris, France; Hallbergmoos, Germany; Milan, Italy; Madrid, Spain; Cheltenham, United Kingdom; North Sydney, Australia; Stockholm, Sweden; and Singapore.

== Tim Wilkerson Sponsorship ==
LRS became one of the sponsors of the NHRA drag racer Tim Wilkerson's Funny Car in 2000. Near the end of the 2002 season, LRS announced that it would increase its support and enable Wilkerson to compete in the tour’s full schedule.

== PGA Sponsorship ==
LRS is the sponsor of the PGA Lincoln Land Championship, held at Panther Creek Country Club since 2019. The Lincoln Land Championship is an event on the PGA's Korn Ferry Tour.
