= Fespa =

- Formation: 1962
- Website: www.fespa.com

The Federation of European Screen Printers Associations (FESPA) is a federation of trade associations and that organizes exhibitions and conferences for the screen printing and digital printing industry.

== Overview ==
FESPA is a "federation of global screen, textile and digital printing trade associations" servicing its members and the print community at large. FESPA are also an events and exhibitions organiser for the wide format printing, screen printing, textile and digital printing community.

The organisation provides a forum for information exchange between member associations resulting in help from the larger to the smaller Associations in recruitment, training and technical studies.

It also runs a number of events and community outreach programmes, including industry research and educational programmes for students, vehicle wrapping competitions, Awards, networking events and design conferences.

== Heritage ==
FESPA was formed as a 'non-profit' organisation in 1962 by a group of screen printing associations whose aim was to create a platform to share knowledge on screen printing technology in Europe.

The original membership consisted of 8 representatives, including Michel Caza - fine art printer to artists including Andy Warhol and Salvador Dalí. As the organisation grew, more associations joined. Current membership stands at around 40 national associations.

The current president is Christophe Aussenac.

== Research ==
FESPA produces market research on the trends, challenges, opportunities and threats confronting the community in partnership with InfoTrends – a research organisation for the print trade.

The reports provide analysis of the state of the marketplace and are funded through the organisation's 'Profit for Purpose' initiative.

== See also ==
- Printing Historical Society
