= Preflight (printing) =

Process of reviewing digital files before publication

In printing, preflight is the process of confirming that the digital files required for the printing process are all present, valid, correctly formatted, and of the desired type. The basic idea is to prepare the files to make them feasible for the correct process such as offset printing and eliminate costly errors and facilitate a smooth production. It is a standard prepress procedure in the printing industry (as it is imposition). The term originates from the preflight checklists used by pilots. The term was first used in a presentation at the Color Connections conference in 1990 by consultant Chuck Weger, and Professor Ron Bertolina was a pioneer for solutions to preflighting in the 1990s.

== Background ==
In a common digital prepress workflow, a collection of computer files provided by clients will be translated from an application-specific format such as Adobe InDesign or QuarkXPress to a format that the raster image processor (RIP) can interpret. But before this rasterization occurs, workers in the prepress department confirm the incoming materials to make sure they are ready to be sent to the RIP. This is an important step because it prevents production delays caused by missing materials or improperly prepared materials. Once the incoming materials have passed the preflight check, they are ready to be put into production and sent to the RIP.

Files were originally printed as Adobe PostScript; however in modern workflows, PDF files have become the popular file type for submitting data to a RIP. The RIP generates the final raster image that will be printed directly (as in desktop inkjet or laser printing), set to photographic film or paper (using an imagesetter), or transferred direct-to-plate.

Depending on the hardware and software components and configurations, RIPs can experience problems rasterizing the image data contained in PostScript or PDF files. If there is a failure in rasterizing the image, it can be costly, as output systems (printers, plate-setters, etc.) consume expensive supplies, can require extensive amounts of time to process complex image data, and require skilled labor to operate.

== The preflight process ==
The process of preflighting a file helps reduce the likelihood of rasterization problems that cause production delays. Page layout software applications (which allow users to combine images, graphics, and text from a variety of formats) automate portions of the preflight process. Typically, client-provided materials are verified by a preflight operator for completeness and to confirm that the incoming materials meet the production requirements. The preflight process checks for:

- transparencies that run on Pantone instead of CMYK
- color corrections wherever required such as rich blacks combinations, color shifts due to overprinting
- trapping requirements for offset printing such as overprints, choke, spreads and knockouts
- images and graphics embedded by the client have been provided and are available to the application
- fonts are accessible to the system
- fonts are not corrupt
- fonts are in a compatible file format
- image files are of formats that the application can process
- image files are of the correct color format, Pantone or CMYK (some RIPs have problems processing RGB images, for example)
- image files are of the correct resolution
- required color profiles are included
- image files are not corrupt
- confirm that the page layout document size, margins, bleeds, marks, and page information all fit within the constraints of the output device and match the client's specifications
- confirm that the correct colour separations or ink plates are being output

Other, more advanced preflight steps might also include:

- removing non-printing data, such as non-printing objects, hidden objects, objects outside the printable area, and objects on layers below
- flattening transparent objects into a single opaque object
- converting fonts to paths
- gathering embedded image and graphic files to one location accessible to the system
- compressing files into an archive format

The specifics of what checks are made are governed by the features of the preflight application, the formats of the client-provided files, and the targeted output device, as well as the printing specifications.

A purpose-built software application is not required to preflight a file, although several commercial applications are available. Many desktop publishing applications have some type of preflight capability; however, they may not be as robust as commercial applications, such as FlightCheck by Markzware Inc. Many printers and publishers utilize high-end preflight and file optimization solutions rather than relying on those within desktop publishing apps. They will make sure the preflight settings match their specific production requirements.

== History ==
Professor Ron Bertolina was a pioneer of the preflighting concept in electronic publishing. In the mid-1990s, he wrote published technical articles and conducted workshops across the US on preflighting for the Graphic Arts Technical Foundation. His preflight checklist, included in the article "Preflighting Digital Files" for GATFWorld magazine, became a standard for printing companies to follow to help to reduce costly errors and thus was a great benefit to the publishing industry. Eventually, preflighting software entered the marketplace to assist designers and publishers in efficiently publishing electronic files.

Early preflight methods were largely manual, and typically relied on checklists that highly skilled prepress operators would use to verify the production readiness of each incoming job. As desktop publishing and graphics applications, PDLs, RIPs, and output devices evolved, the process became more complex. Software plug-ins and stand-alone applications that supported the major desktop publishing applications were then developed to meet that need, along with proprietary tools made by hardware manufacturers and commercial printers and service bureaus. The developers of the major applications, such as Adobe, then began to incorporate functionality in their applications, leveraging their knowledge of their own file formats.
