= Flint Group =

International manufacturing company supplying the printing and packaging industry

Flint Group Packaging Solutions
- Type: Private company
- Industry: Packaging and printing
- Headquarters: St Helier, Jersey
- Area served: Worldwide
- Key people: Pepyn Dinandt, Chief Executive Officer
- Products: Printing inks, coatings, digital consumables & printing engines, transfer media and pressroom chemicals for the packaging and printing industries
- Revenue: €1.4 billion (2025)
- Number of employees: 5,000 (2025)
- Website: flintgrp.com xeikon.com web-offset.flintgrp.com

Flint Group Packaging Solutions is a manufacturer and supplier of printing inks, coatings, digital consumables and printing engines, transfer media, and pressroom chemicals for the packaging and printing industries. As of 2025, the company reported revenue of approximately €1.4 billion and employed about 5,000 people worldwide. With 80 sites across 32 countries, Flint Group Packaging Solutions operates in the global flexible packaging, paper and board, narrow web, and sheetfed offset printing markets.

Flint Group Web Offset is an affiliated business focused on heatset and news inks worldwide.

As of 2025, Flint Group Packaging Solutions reported revenue of approximately €1.4 billion and employed about 5,000 people. The company operated 80 sites in 32 countries. Flint Group has been listed by market research firms among the major companies operating in the global printing inks market.

Flint Group Web Offset is an affiliated business focused on heatset and news inks.

== History ==
Flint Group’s history goes back to the 18th century and is characterised by mergers and acquisitions. As it pertains to recent history, in 2004, XSYS Print Solutions was formed from the merger of BASF Printing Systems and ANI Printing Inks. In late 2005, Flint Group was created through the combination of Flint Ink Corporation and XSYS Print Solutions. In 2007, Flint Group acquired Day International, a manufacturer of printing blankets, sleeves, pressroom chemicals, and printing supplies. In 2015, Flint Group acquired Xeikon, a digital solutions provider to the packaging and commercial printing markets, and established a joint venture with Continental Inks in South Africa to form Flint Group Africa. In 2016, Flint Group acquired Printec Industries Inc., Druckfarben Limited, American Inks & Coatings, and Advanced Color Systems. In 2026, as the company adopted Flint Group Packaging Solutions as its trading name while retaining Flint Group as its legal corporate name.

== Business segments ==
As one of the major suppliers in its industry, Flint Group Packaging Solutions operates through five strategic business segments:

- Flexible Packaging
- Paper & Board
- Narrow Web
- Sheetfed Offset
- Flint Group Digital Xeikon
