= AirPrint =

Feature by Apple

- Logo
- Developers: Apple Inc. and Hewlett-Packard
- Release: November 22, 2010; 15 years ago
- Website: support.apple.com/en-us/HT201311

AirPrint is a feature in Apple Inc.'s macOS, iOS, and iPadOS operating systems for printing without installing printer-specific drivers.

Connection is via a local area network (often via Wi-Fi), either directly to AirPrint-compatible printers, or to non-compatible shared printers by way of a computer running Microsoft Windows, Linux, or macOS.

== History and printer compatibility ==
Following the iPad's introduction in 2010, user concerns were raised about the product's inability to print, at least through a supported Apple solution. Apple CEO Steve Jobs reportedly replied "It will come" in May 2010 to a user request for printing.

AirPrint's Fall 2010 introduction, as part of iOS 4.2, gave iPhones and iPads printing capability for the first time. AirPrint for Mac computers was introduced in the Mac OS X Lion release.

At launch, twelve printers were AirPrint compatible, all of them from the HP Photosmart Plus e-All-in-One series. As of July 2020, that number had grown to about 6,000 compatible printer models from two dozen different manufacturers. The current list can be found on Apple's support site. The related technology is covered by US patent 2011194123A1, "Printer that supports driverless printing".

AirPrint was originally intended for iOS devices and connected via a Wi-Fi network only, and thus required a Wi-Fi access point. However, with the introduction of AirPrint to the macOS desktop platform in 2012, Macs connected to the network via Ethernet connection could also print using the AirPrint protocol—not just those connected via Wi-Fi. Direct Wi-Fi connection between the device and the printer is not supported by default, but has appeared as the 'HP ePrint Wireless Direct AirPrint' feature. It supports several page description languages (PDLs): a proprietary PDL called Apple Raster or URF (Universal Raster Format), as well as PDF and JPEG. A printer must advertise URF support to work with AirPrint.

== Non-AirPrint printer support ==
A number of software solutions allow for a non-AirPrint printer to be used with iOS devices, by introducing an intermediary system that is accessible via Wi-Fi and connected to the printer. Since AirPrint is driverless, such a configuration compensates for the printer's lack of native AirPrint support by using the drivers on the intermediary system instead.

The simplest solution for all platforms is to create a new Bonjour service that tricks iOS clients into believing they're talking to an AirPrint device. Many blog posts and commercial software products exist to accomplish this, as well as open-source solutions in Linux. This works in many cases because AirPrint is an extension of the Internet Printing Protocol (IPP), which many printers already support either directly, or as a result of being shared through an intermediary system (typically CUPS, the Mac/Linux printing system). This approach is limited, however, as the AirPrint-specific components of the protocol are missing. This can lead to compatibility issues and unexpected results. Some software packages address this completely by translating between the two dialects of IPP, avoiding compatibility issues, while most just re-share printers using the AirPrint service name.

For Microsoft Windows, there are free and paid solutions.

On macOS, a Bonjour service exists that enables AirPrint support for non-AirPrint printers. Commercial macOS software for this purpose includes Netputing handyPrint and Ecamm Printopia.

In most Linux distributions, AirPrint support should be automatic with the CUPS default printing subsystem since version 1.4.6, which has been released on January 6, 2011 (e.g. in Ubuntu 11.04 and later or in Fedora 15 and later). CUPS servers before version 1.4.6 with DNS-based Service Discovery can also be configured manually, by adding DNS-SD printer service discovery records to a name server.

=== Apps and utilities ===
There are a number of third-party solutions, available on the Apple App Store and elsewhere, that allow printing to non-AirPrint printers directly or via an application helper. Printopia Pro is a commercial solution designed to allow AirPrint to work on large business and education networks. It offers features useful to large organizations including centralized management, directory integration, and allows AirPrint to operate across subnets. It requires a server running Mac OS X 10.9 or later, and one server can potentially serve an entire organization.

== See also ==
- Internet Printing Protocol
- Mopria Alliance
