= Manroland =

Manufacturer of offset presses

Manroland AG

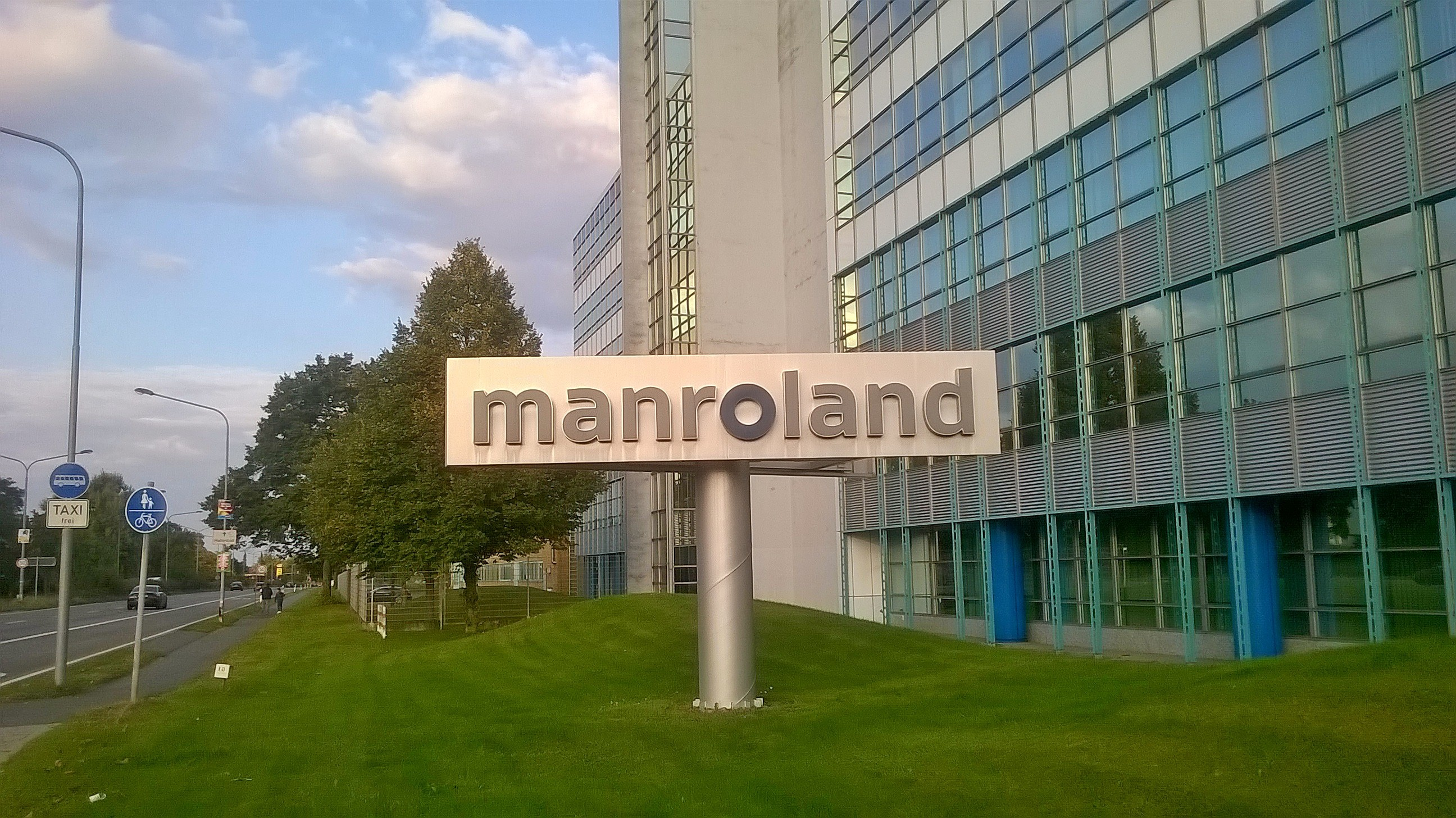
- Headquarter in Offenbach am Main
- Type: Limited company (Aktiengesellschaft)
- Industry: presses
- Predecessor: Eisenwerk Wülfel
- Founded: 1979 (sheetfed 1871, webfed 1845)
- Headquarters: Offenbach am Main (Hesse), Germany
- Key people: Gerd Finkbeiner (Chief Executive Officer)
- Revenue: EUR 942 million
- Number of employees: 7,147 (as at 2010)
- Website: www.manroland.com

Manroland AG manufactures newspaper web offset presses, commercial web offset presses, and sheetfed offset presses for commercial, publications and packaging printing.

The company has production facilities in Offenbach am Main and Augsburg. Manroland Mechatronic Systems in Plauen offers third-party customers the opportunity to expand their production capacity.Together with its subsidiary companies, manroland AG employed around 7,000 people worldwide as of 2010.

== History ==
History of manroland

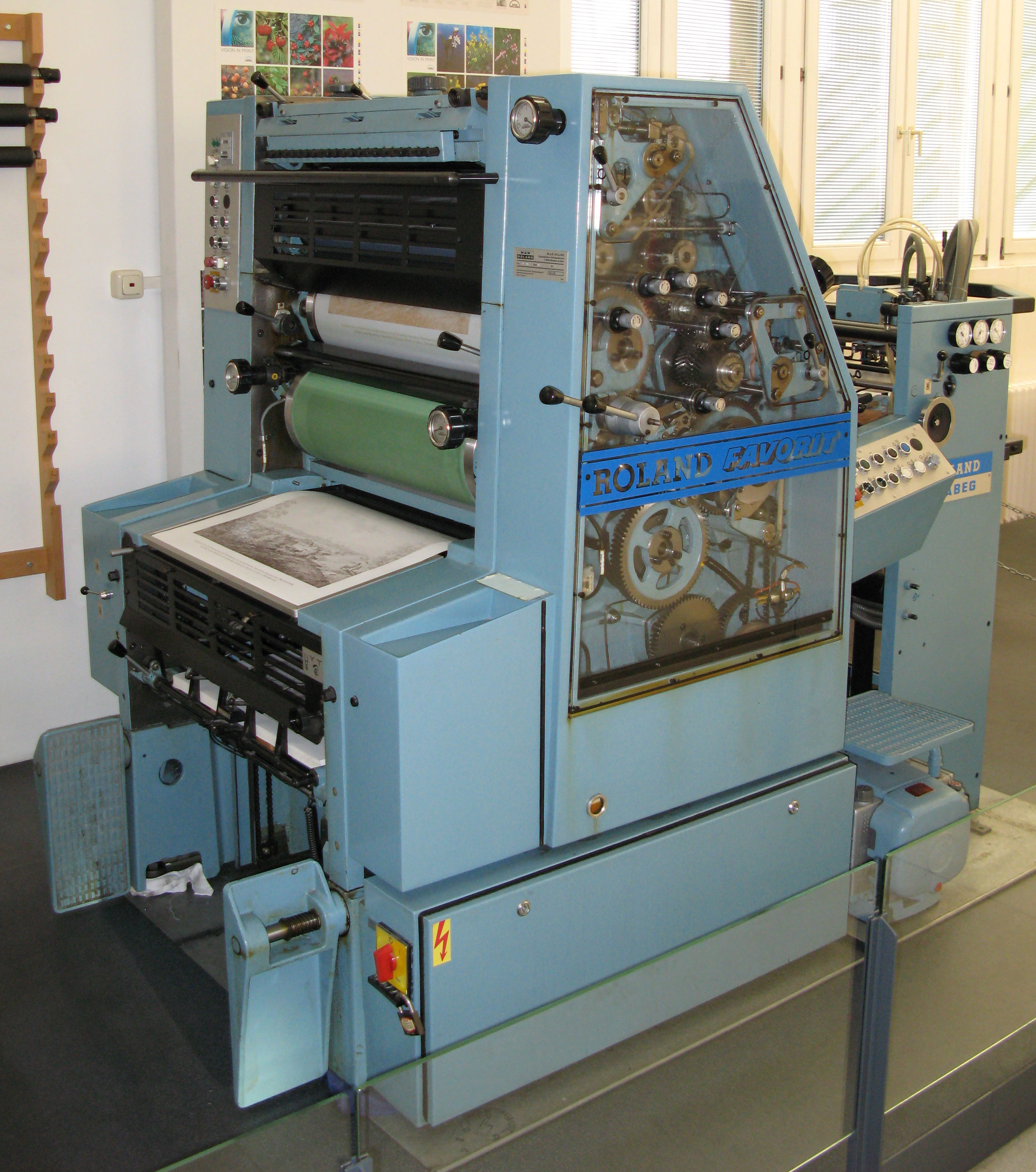
Type "Roland Favorit RF01"

In 1844, Carl August Reichenbach, nephew of the founder of KBA, Friedrich Koenig, and Carl Buz established the "Reichenbach’sche Maschinenfabrik" (Reichenbach's machine factory) in Augsburg. Six months later the two printing press pioneers supplied their first "Schnellpresse" (automatic cylinder press) to Nikolaus Hartmann's printing plant in Augsburg.

Besides the automatic cylinder press, the 19th century saw another innovation in printing press construction and a newspaper publisher was behind this as well. Around 1850 the question arose whether the rotary press principle was suitable for letterpress printing. John Walter III, publisher of "The Times" in London, commissioned the two engineers J.C. MacDonald and John Calverly to develop and build the world's first rotary press for newspaper printing. This became known as the "Walter press". In June 1872, Maschinenfabrik Augsburg sent its development head Gustav Bissinger to England. Fact-finding visits by German engineers to factories and workshops in England, the leading industrial nation of that era, were not uncommon in those days. After that the first rotary press from Maschinenfabrik Augsburg was quickly designed. Although it also worked on the Walter principle, it was smaller and lighter and easier to operate. In May 1873 it was presented at the World Fair in Vienna.

Two years earlier, in 1871, the two engineers Louis Faber and Adolf Schleicher founded the company Faber & Schleicher as an "Association for Production of Automatic Lithographic Presses" in Offenbach am Main. This city has played a very important part in the history of lithography because it was here that Alois Senefelder built his first lithographic stone presses for the André music publishing company. Faber & Schleicher built their first automatic litho stone press in 1879, the "Albatros", which had an output of 600 to 700 sheets per hour. Along with the experience and know-how gained from lithography as well as printing on zinc and other metal plates, the real breakthrough came with the emergence of offset printing at the beginning of the 20th century. The inventors Ira Washington Rubel and Caspar Herrmann took over the indirect printing principle known from printing on metal plate and developed this new process between 1904 and 1907. Faber & Schleicher's specialization in offset printing began in 1911 with the model "Roland", the world's first sheetfed rotary offset press, which was awarded a gold medal at the World Fair in Turin. The name Roland was chosen because "Faber & Schleicher" can hardly be pronounced in English-speaking regions.

=== The history of manroland in key points ===
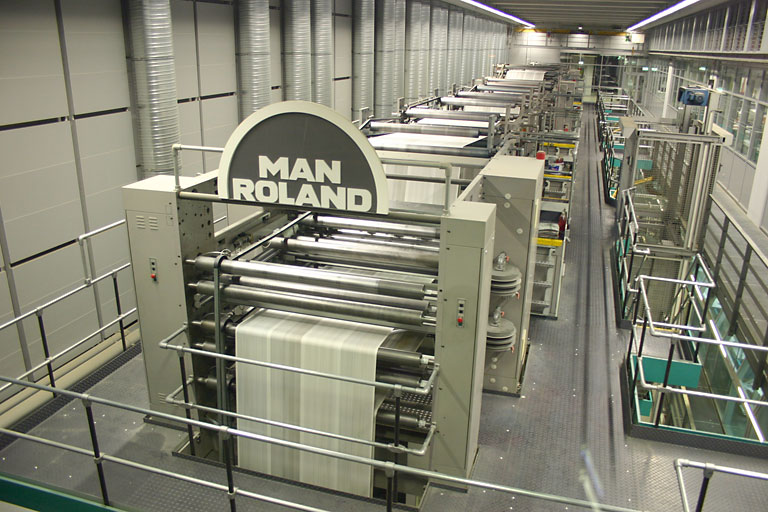
Web-fed offset lithographic press at speed

The history of manroland goes back to the origins of printing press manufacturing. It begins for MAN Roland in 1845 with the first automatic letterpress machine.

- 1845: Carl August Reichenbach from Augsburger Druckmaschinenbau delivers the first automatic cylinder press to Nikolaus Hartmann's printing plant in Augsburg.
- 1857: A joint stock company was formed and renamed Maschinenfabrik Augsburg.
- 1872: A complete newspaper printing plant was set up – with steam boiler and steam engine.
- 1873: The first "machine for printing continuous paper" (i.e. from a reel) was presented at the World Fair in Vienna.
- 1889: Through an amalgamation the "Vereinigte Maschinenfabrik Augsburg und Maschinenbaugesellschaft Nürnberg A.G., Augsburg" was founded and then in 1908 renamed "Maschinenfabrik Augsburg-Nürnberg AG" – MAN AG.
- 1911: The first Roland sheetfed offset press was built.
- 1921: The first prototype of a three-cylinder web offset press in Berliner format was developed.
- 1922: A new single-color offset press, the Klein-Roland 00, was presented which could print up to 5000 sheets per hour.
- 1931: Development of a rotary press that could print 25,000 16-page newspapers per hour.
- Second World War
- 1951: A four-color sheetfed offset press, the Ultra, was presented at the first drupa trade show.
- 1960: Three-quarters of the total volume of all German daily newspapers were being produced on presses from Augsburg.
- 1972: Introduction of the ROLAND 800, the first sheetfed offset press with an integrated color control system that permitted a printing speed of 10,000 sheets per hour.
- 1974: The biggest rotary offset press in Europe was built in Augsburg: a 17-web COLORMAN with 62 printing units.
- 1979: MAN Roland Druckmaschinen AG (Offenbach/Main) was founded. This company was formed by the amalgamation of "Roland Offset- und Maschinenfabrik Faber and Schleicher" with "Augsburger M.A.N.-Druck- and Maschinenbau".
- 1986: Introduction of the LITHOMAN web offset press with a speed of 60,000 cylinder rph and electronic control console technology.
- 1987: MAVO the first Motorola 6800 chip based press remote technology enters the US in Asheville NC. Zravko Krovinovic and his team gave with Augsburg's hard- and software departments creations birth to the new technology in the US. The Colorman 75 was upgraded in 2008. The US newspaper decline shut the operation down in 2009.
- 1990: PECOM control console technology was introduced. Together with a new automation concept for the medium-format ROLAND 700, this enabled speeds of up to 15,000 sheets per hour to be achieved.
- 1990: with the reunification of Germany, KBA takes the control of VEB Planeta, the biggest offset printing machines builder in the Soviet Bloc.
- 1995: The LITHOMAN was presented at drupa with a new press concept for commercial web offset printing. With a host of additional components it can be extended to become a multifunctional production system for all requirements. The first Intranet based remote trouble shooting systems show great cost savings for many customers. At the same drupa show in Düsseldorf, the ROLAND 900, a large-format sheetfed offset press, also made its debut.
- Due to a worldwide recession in the printing industry, MAN Roland experienced a severe crisis in the years 2001 till 2004.
- In the meantime manroland realigned to future. In 2002, manroland acquired a controlling interest in the software company ppi Media GmbH. ppi Media, headquartered in Hamburg, serves customers worldwide and develops workflow solutions for automated planning and production processes in publishing and printing. ppi Media was founded in 1984 and employs approximately 150 staff at its offices in Hamburg, Kiel and Chicago.
- Following extensive restructuring, the company returned to profitability in 2005.
- In January 2006, MAN sold the majority interest in its subsidiary company MAN Roland Druckmaschinen AG to the investor Allianz Capital Partners GmbH (ACP) - Allianz Private Equity, itself a subsidiary company of Allianz. The shares are now held by an investment company in which MAN holds 35% and ACP 65%. As well as acquiring the shares, the investment company also took over the entire business activities and all subsidiaries, including existing liabilities. The intention is to further develop the world's second largest manufacturer of printing systems and go public with it in a few years time. The company stated that the transaction was intended to strengthen its position in printing technology.
- October 2006: New technology was launched in Mainz, the birthplace of Johannes Gutenberg – DirectDrive. Directly driven plate cylinders enable makeready time to be reduced by 60%.
- May 2008: MAN Roland Druckmaschinen AG becomes manroland AG. The new logo was presented on 28 May 2008 at the drupa press conference in Düsseldorf.
- June 2009: As the U.S. economy declined, manroland USA faced major layoffs.
- 2010: Introduction of autoprint: stands for the vision of a printing press that, at the push of one button – One Touch – brings the highest degree of automation of offset printing. manroland already leads the field in automation of newspaper and commercial web offset presses and has now implemented the concept in sheetfed offset as well.
- 2010: manroland markets inkjet-based digital printing systems from Océ. In the same year the first 96-page web-fed printing system LITHOMAN was sold.
- 2011: In addition, with manroland Industrial Services, the company offers contract staffing.
- November 2011: manroland files for insolvency.
- January 2012, 18th: The web division in Augsburg is sold to the German L. Possehl & Co. mbH and renamed into manroland web systems.
- February 2012, 10th: The sheetfed division in Offenbach along with all real estate including around 1,000,000 sq. ft. of manufacturing facilities in Offenbach and nearby Mainhausen, and with over 40 sales and service subsidiaries worldwide, takes up business as manroland sheetfed systems purchased and led by the British Langley Holdings plc. During the insolvency around 1,000 employees had been dismissed at the Offenbach headquarters and manufacturing plant.
- March 2012, 30th: manroland sheetfed and Landa Corporation announce a strategic partnership whereby Landa will provide manroland sheetfed with its Nanographic PrintingTM technology.
- January 2013: PLAMAG closed its operations as no buyer is found
- 5 November 2014: The Roland 700 Evolution is introduced.
- August 2018 Manroland merges with its arch-rival, Goss International, to form Manroland Goss Web Systems.

== Products ==
The company's product range includes small-, medium- and large-format sheet-fed and web-fed offset presses.

- A new 36/52 (00) small-format press was introduced at Drupa 2008
- Newspaper and commercial web offset presses
- Printvalue: Services, consumable materials and consulting

== Coordinates of Manroland facilities ==
- location Offenbach am Main 50.112836°N 8.804929°E
- location Augsburg 48.38245°N 10.88985°E
- location Plauen 50.52800°N 12.11150°E
