= Mopria =

Printer and scanner industry association

- Formation: September 2013
- Founder: Canon, Hewlett-Packard, Samsung, and Xerox
- Type: Trade association
- Location: San Ramon, California
- Website: mopria.org

Mopria Alliance Inc. is an American non-profit organization for technical standards related to printing and scanning.

The alliance was formed in September 2013 by Canon, Hewlett-Packard (now HP Inc.), Samsung, and Xerox. Other member organizations include Google, Microsoft, and Qualcomm.

The Mopria Alliance and its member companies have published certifications for mobile devices, mobile print accessories, and 9,000+ printer models from 24 brands, representing more than 120 million print devices in use today. More than 5 billion Android devices support Mopria through the Mopria Print Service and the Android Default Print Service, including Amazon Fire tablets running Fire OS 7 or higher. Microsoft has supported Mopria in Windows since Windows 10 version 1809.

== Organization ==
The Mopria Alliance was formed as a Delaware non-profit membership corporation and operates as a 501(c)(6) nonprofit corporation. Representatives from member organizations can serve on the board of directors and the three primary working groups: technical, certification, and marketing.

Member companies include leading mobile device providers, software application vendors, printer and scanner manufacturers and OS providers:

- Adobe Inc.
- Alps Alpine Co.
- Brother Industries
- Canon Inc. (founder)
- Cirros Document Solutions
- DEX Imaging
- Epson
- Fiery
- Fujifilm Business Innovation
- HP Inc. (founder)
- Katun
- Konica Minolta
- Kyocera
- Lexmark
- LRS
- Microsoft
- OKI Data
- Pantum
- PaperCut
- Primax
- Qualcomm
- Ricoh
- Riso
- Samsung Electronics (founder)
- SOFHA
- Toshiba
- Tungsten Automation
- Vivo
- Xerox (founder)
- Y Soft

== Standards and products ==
=== Universal standards ===
Mopria Alliance develops Mopria, a set of industry standards which allow users to print and scan without requiring them to install device-specific applications or drivers. As of February 2026, more than 9,000 printer and MFP models work with Mopria, with more than 120 million units in use.

=== Mopria Print Service ===
The Mopria Print Service for Android was released to the Google Play Store in October 2014. It is a plug-in that enables printing from Android devices to Mopria certified printers and MFPs.

A client uses mDNS to automatically discover a printer through the local 802.11 wireless network. The printer must be connected to the network either wirelessly or with an Ethernet cable.

=== Windows support for Mopria certified printers ===
Microsoft began supporting Mopria certified network printers in Windows 10 version 1809, and would use Mopria if device-specific printer drivers were not available. Microsoft expanded support to all Mopria certified network and USB printers in Windows 10 21H2 and Windows 11. Windows 11 24H2 introduced Windows Protected Print Mode (WPP), an opt-in feature which disables third-party printer drivers and relies solely on the built-in Internet Printing Protocol (IPP) class driver; printers that don't support Mopria cannot be used in WPP mode.

Microsoft plans to stop distributing any third-party printer software via Windows Update on July 1, 2027. It recommends that printer makers that wish to offer enhanced functionality create UWP-based Printer Support Apps (PSAs), which can expand upon the Mopria-based IPP class driver that Microsoft includes in Windows.
