= Printer driver =

Software for connecting to a printer

In computers, a printer driver or a print processor is a piece of software on a computer that converts the data to be printed to a format that a printer can understand. The purpose of printer drivers is to allow applications to do printing without being aware of the technical details of each printer model.

Printer drivers should not be confused with print spoolers, which queue print jobs and send them successively to a printer.

== Printer drivers in different operating systems ==
=== Unix and Unix-like ===
Unix and other Unix-like systems such as Linux and OS X use CUPS (short for Common Unix Printing System), a modular printing system for Unix-like computer operating systems, which allows a computer to act as a print server. A computer running CUPS is a host that can accept print jobs from client computers, process them, and send them to the appropriate printer. Printer drivers are typically implemented as filters. They are usually named the front end of the printing system, while the printer spoolers constitute the back end.

Backends are also used to determine the available devices. On startup, each backend is asked for a list of devices it supports, and any information that is available.

=== DOS ===
With most other programs, the job of persuading the computer and printer to talk to each other feels like translating between Finnish and Turkish when you only know English.

— Edward Mendelson approving of WordPerfect's printer drivers, 1985

DOS supports predefined character devices PRN:, LPT1:, LPT2: and LPT3: associated with parallel printers supported in the system. Similarly, serial printers can be used with AUX:, COM1:, COM2:, COM3: and COM4:.

Users can use commands like, for example, "COPY file1 LPT1:" to print the content of a file to a printer. The contents is transferred to the printer without any interpretation. Therefore, this method of printing is either for files already stored in the corresponding printer's language or for generic text files without more than simple line-oriented formatting.

DOS also provides a dynamically loadable print spooler named PRINT as well as optional support to support screen captures also in graphics mode through GRAPHICS. If the optional character device driver PRINTER.SYS is loaded, DOS provides its code page switching support also for the associated printers—different types of dot matrix and ink jet printers are supported by default.

Beyond this, there are no system-wide printer-specific drivers for use at application level under MS-DOS/PC DOS. Under DR-DOS, however, the SCRIPT command can be loaded to run in the background in order to intercept and convert printer output from applications into PostScript to support PS-capable printers also by applications not supporting them directly.

In order to support more complex printing for different models of printers, each application (e.g. a word processor) may be shipped with its own printer drivers, which were essentially descriptions of printer escape sequences. Printers, too, have been supplied with drivers for the most popular applications. In addition, it's possible for applications to include tools for editing printer description, in case there was no ready driver. In the days when DOS was widely used, many printers had emulation modes for Epson FX-80 and IBM Proprinter commands. Many more recent laser printers also have emulation modes for HP PCL (HP LaserJet) or PostScript printers which will work in DOS. It appears that these are also compatible with Windows 3.x.

=== Windows ===
On Microsoft Windows systems, printer drivers make use of GDI (Unidrv or PScript-based) or XPS (XPSDrv). Programs then use the same standard APIs to draw text and pictures both on screen and on paper. Printers which use GDI natively are commonly referred to as Winprinters and are considered incompatible with other operating systems, although there is software (such as PrintFil) which will make these printers work in a DOS prompt within Windows.

Win32 APIs also allow applications to send data directly to the spooler, bypassing the printer driver; however, few applications actually use this option.

On Windows 7, the printer driver is usually located in either the C:\Windows\System32\DriverStore\FileRepository or C:\Windows\System32\spool\DRIVERS\x64\3 folders.

=== Amiga ===
The original AmigaOS up to 1.3 supported printers through a standard series of drivers stored at the required path "DEVS:Printers". All printer drivers were stored in that directory, and covered the standard printers in 1985-1989 circa, included Epson FX standard driver, Xerox 4020, HP, etcetera.

Any Amiga printer driver had to communicate though the standard Amiga printer.device (the default standard hardware device of Amiga dealing with printers), and the standard parallel.device (which controlled parallel port) and the driver would then control the printer on its own.

Amiga printer drivers were an innovation for their time. They spared users from individually configuring each of their applications. They had the ability to print up to 4096 colors.

Through the use of the Printer Preferences program printers could be connected to the serial port as well.

Amiga also had support for a virtual device "PRT:" to refer to printer.device so, for example the command "COPY file TO PRT:" caused the file to be printed directly bypassing parallel.device and the default printer driver. Amiga used ANSI escape codes, not the special ones defined by the various printer manufacturers. This way every application on the Amiga could use the same standard set of control sequences and wouldn't need to know which printer is actually connected. The printer driver then translated these standard sequences into the special sequences a certain printer understands.

Amiga internal function "PWrite" of printer.device writes 'length' bytes directly to the printer. This function is generally called on by printer drivers to send their buffer(s) to the printer. Number of buffers are decided by the persons who created the driver. Amiga lacked a standard Printer Spooler.

Since AmigaOS 2.0 a standard printer.device was changed to control various printers at same time. The Printer preferences were divided in three main panels: Prefs:Printer which selects main printer and other basic elements such as "Print Spacing" and "Paper Size". PrinterGFX controlled features like Dithering and Scaling. PrinterPS controlled Postscript Printers. The printer drivers surprisingly remained almost same of Workbench 1.3, with 4096 limits.

This fact led Amiga users to prefer third party Printer Systems with their own drivers, like TurboPrint and PrintStudio, which introduced not only recent drivers, but also featured a functioning Printer Spooler into Amiga, and featured 16 million colors printing. MorphOS uses a special version of TurboPrint to pilot recent printers.

Many Amiga programs like DTP programs as PageStream featured in the past its own printer drivers.

USB printers are automatically recognized by the Poseidon USB Stack. This stack is capable of detecting any USB device by its class, but printers still require a driver to be controlled.

== Types of drivers ==
In addition to being install-able on a computer, drivers could also be present in the embedded firmware of printers and made available through a networking protocol (e.g. IPP). The embedded firmware of a printer could thus eliminate the need to install any driver on a computer, by accepting print data in a general purpose format (e.g. PDF) via a networking protocol. Despite some efforts to standardize various stages of the printing pipeline, printer interfaces are largely still very proprietary and manufacturer-specific. Hence, nature of functions performed by drivers can vary. Nonetheless, based on the function performed, drivers can be classified as follows.

=== Device-independent converters ===
These drivers can convert print data from one general purpose format (e.g. PDF, DVI etc) to another general purpose format (e.g. PS). Examples include Ghostscript, etc.

=== Converters to device-specific format ===
These drivers convert print data from one format (e.g. PS) to a final device-specific format that the printer hardware can process and create a print. These drivers act as the last stage in delivering a print job to the printer. These drivers are more likely to be embedded in printer firmware.

Examples of manufacturer specific formats include:

- Printer Command Language (PCL) (Hewlett-Packard)
- PostScript (PS) (Adobe)
- Ink Jet Printer Data Stream (Kodak)
- Samsung Printer Language
- Ultra Fast Rendering (Canon)

== Packaging formats ==
Install-able drivers can be packaged in various formats. PPD is a popular packaging format for drivers that accept Postscript data or PDF data as input. Due to dominance of select operating systems, the operating system–driver interface is more standardized than driver–printer interfaces. Hence there is more standardization in packaging formats of drivers than the actual functions performed by drivers.

- PostScript Printer Description file Usually the operating system needs to know the characteristics of a printer. The PPD files are the normal way to supply this information. They have the advantage of being system independent, and there is a freely available large database of them, Foomatic.
- CUPS filter This format is used by CUPS on Linux systems.

== See also ==
- CUPS
- ESC/P
- HP Universal Print Driver (HP UPD)
- List of emulators
- Open-source hardware
- PostScript Printer Description (PPD)
- Print (command)
- Printer Command Language (PCL)
- Windows Vista printing technologies
- Virtual printer
- Open XML Paper Specification (XPS)
- Portable Document Format (PDF)
- Printer spooler
