= LPQ =

LPQ or lpq may refer to:

== Places ==
- Leiyang West railway station, Hunan China (telegraph code LPQ)
- Luang Prabang International Airport, Laos (IATA code LPQ)
- Liangping District (abbreviated: LPQ), Chongqing Municipality, Sichuan, China
- LPQ (Punic: 𐤋𐤐𐤒), Carthage; also known as Leptis Magna, Roman Libya, Roman Empire; the modern city of Al-Khums, Libya
- LPQ (Punic: 𐤋𐤐𐤒), Carthage; also known as Leptis Parva, Roman Empire

== Groups, organizations, companies ==
- Le Pain Quotidien, an international chain of bakery restaurants
- Liberal Party of Quebec, a provincial political party in Quebec, Canada

== Other uses ==
- lpq a command originating in BSD's Berkeley printing system to show the current print queue in multiple architectures including Linux and Unix
- Lpq in Bocheński notation for the default formulation of material nonimplication
- laparoscopy-to-laparotomy quotient (LPQ); see Laparoscopy
