= Michael Sweet (programmer) =

Michael R. Sweet is a computer scientist known for being the original developer of CUPS. He also developed flPhoto, was the original developer of the Gimp-Print software (now known as Gutenprint), and continues to develop codedoc, HTMLDOC, Mini-XML, PAPPL, and many other projects. Sweet has contributed to other free software projects such as FLTK, Newsd, and Samba. He co-owned and ran Easy Software Products (ESP), a small company that specialized in Internet and printing technologies and is now the Chief Technology Officer of Lakeside Robotics Corporation.

== Career ==
Sweet graduated in Computer Science at the SUNY Institute of Technology in Utica-Rome. He then spent several years working for TASC and Dyncorp on real-time computer graphics. After releasing a freeware tool "topcl", in 1993 Sweet set up Easy Software Products (ESP) and developed the ESP Print software. He started work on CUPS software in 1997 and in 1999 released it under the GNU GPL license along with the commercially licensed ESP Print Pro.

Apple included CUPS in its macOS operating system and in February 2007, they purchased the copyright to the CUPS source code which, unusually for an open source project, was wholly owned by ESP. Apple also hired Sweet to continue the development of CUPS.

While working for Apple, Sweet spent six years as the chair of the Printer Working Group (PWG).

Sweet left Apple in December 2019 to start Lakeside Robotics Corporation. Sweet continues to be secretary of the Internet Printing Protocol (IPP) working group, a designated expert for IPP and the Printer management information base (MIB) for the Internet Engineering Task Force (IETF), and is active in printing standards development within the PWG. He has written several books including Serial Programming Guide for POSIX Operating Systems, OpenGL Superbible, and CUPS (Common Unix Printing System).
