= Epson MX-80 =

1980 dot matrix printer

MX-80
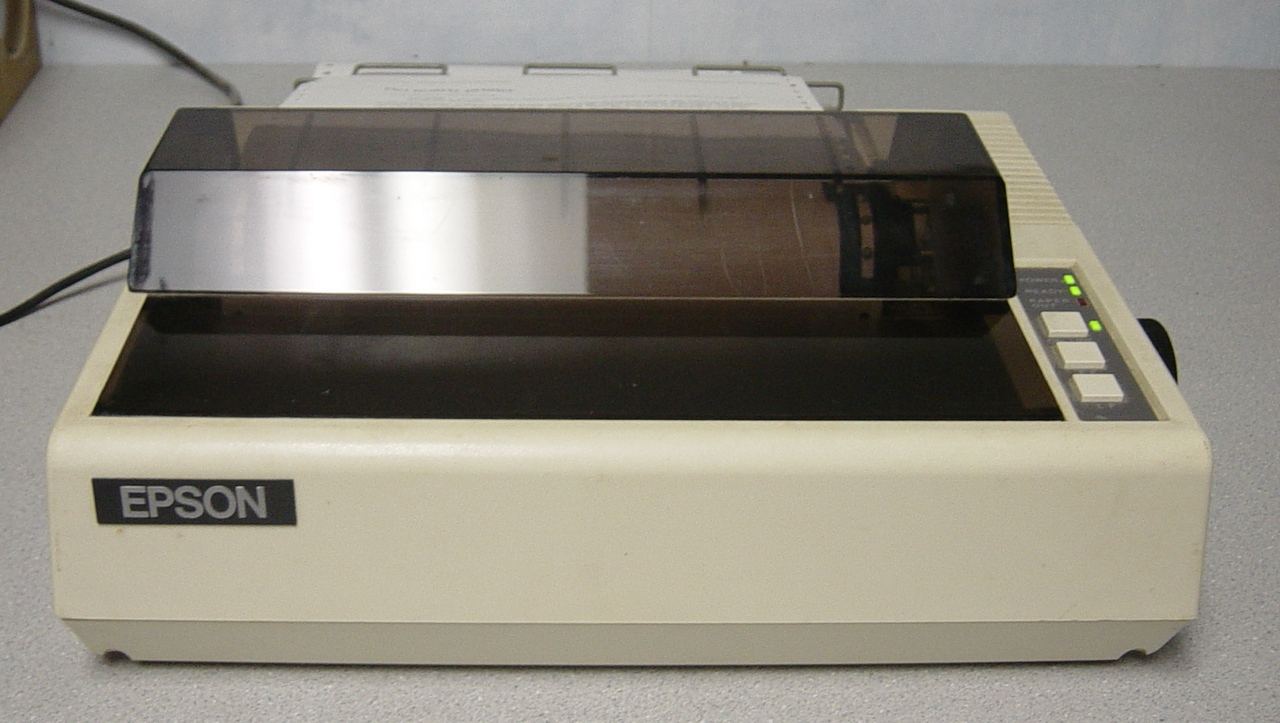
- Manufacturer: Seiko Epson
- Introduced: October 1980; 45 years ago
- Cost: US$650
- Type: Serial dot matrix printer
- Connection: Parallel, RS-232 serial, or GPIB

The MX-80 is a serial dot matrix printer introduced by Seiko Epson in 1980. The MX-80 is capable of printing a maximum of 132 columns per line, while its 9-pin printhead was the first disposable, user-serviceable printhead on the market.

The MX-80 was a massive commercial success for Epson and soon became the best-selling dot matrix printer in the world, selling well over one million units over the course of its market lifespan. It enjoyed a high level of popularity in the personal computer marketplace for much of the 1980s and was the progenitor of the ESC/P page description language. The form factor and basic functionality of the MX-80 soon became a de facto standard for manufacturers of inexpensive dot matrix printers. Epson released a number of succeeding revisions of the MX-80 before replacing the entire line with the FX-80 in 1983.

== Background and development ==
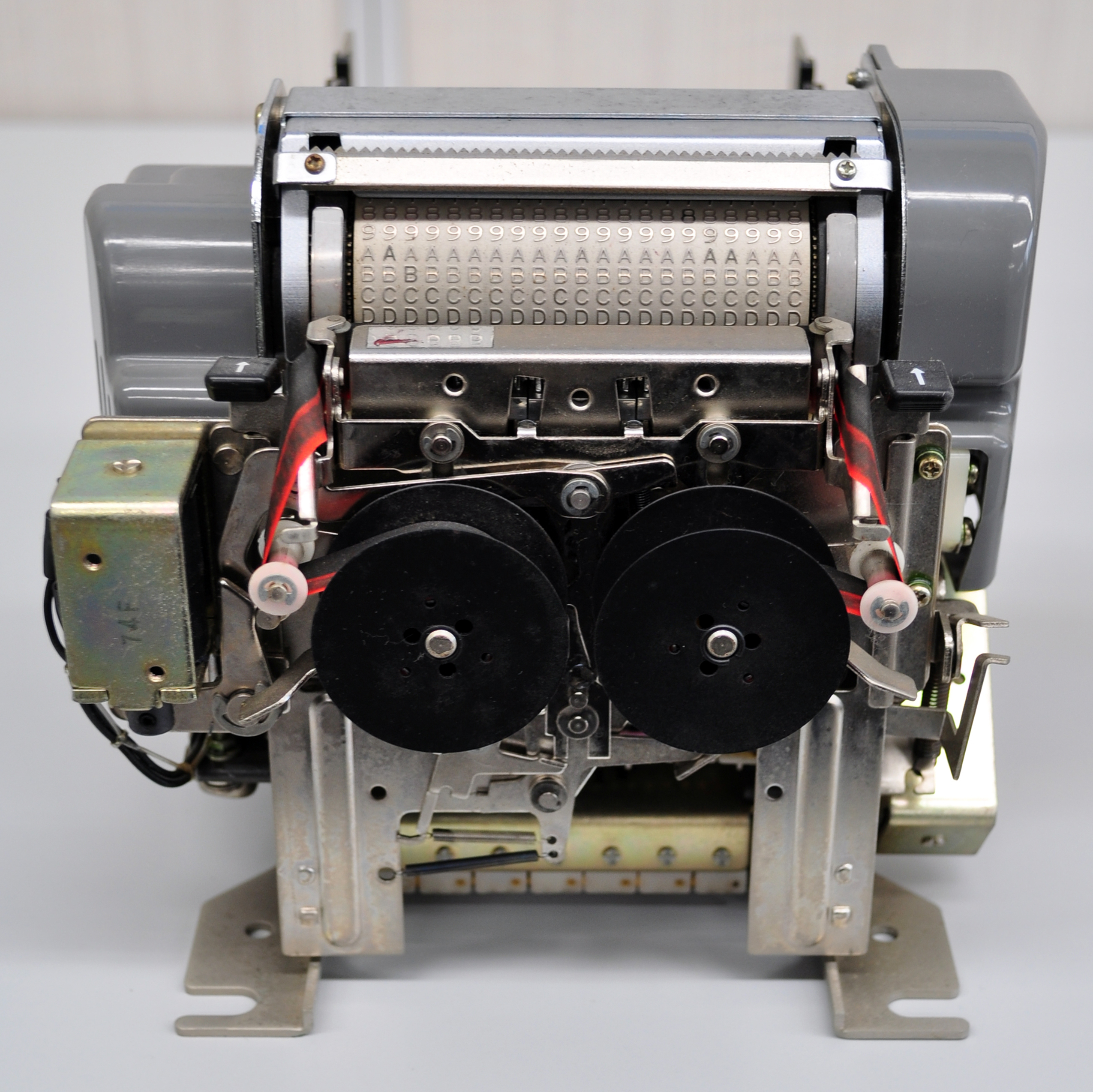
Seiko Epson began producing printers in 1968 with the EP-101, a miniature drum printer.

Seiko Epson (known as Shinshu Seiki until 1975) entered the market for computer printers with the EP-101, a miniature drum printer, in 1968. In early 1978, Epson introduced the TX-80, their first serial dot matrix printer. Inspired by the success of Centronics' Model 779 dot matrix printer, Epson spent only three months developing the TX-80, which was the first sub-US$2,000 dot matrix printer on the market. It was also Epson's first printer marketed in the United States. Despite its relatively low cost, as well as a lucrative contract with Commodore to market the printer for users of their PET microcomputer, the TX-80 sold slower than Epson had anticipated and ultimately failed to achieve a large market share, being pulled from the American market not too long after its introduction. According to the computer entrepreneur Stan Veit, the TX-80 was built to a cost, suffering from unreliable components and poor build quality.

Epson then spent three years devising their next dot matrix printer. During development, the company pioneered a number of features, such as logical bidirectional printing to maximize throughput and disposable printheads. Epson also pursued better quality components to make the printer more durable while still being inexpensive. The resulting MX-80 was released October 1980, amid a period of explosive growth in the microcomputer industry. Epson supported the rollout of the MX-80 with an extensive print marketing campaign, produced by Ripley-Woodbury Advertising. The company meanwhile hired David A. Lien, a prolific computer writer at the time, to write the printer's manual in a user-friendly manner, eschewing the jargon and otherwise terse technical language ubiquitous in contemporary printer manuals. Epson also peppered the manual with numerous cartoon illustrations in keeping with the accessible tone. Epson partnered with the retailer ComputerLand for the latter to sell and service MX-80, supplementing Epson's own national service centers.

== Specifications ==
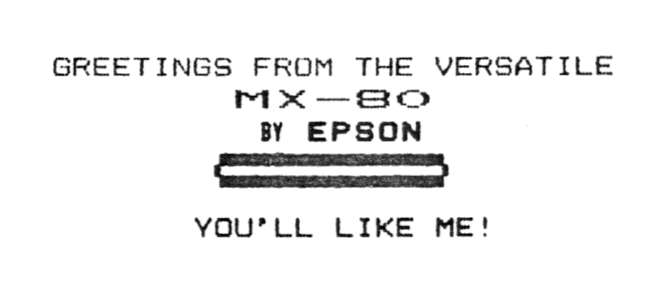
Sample output of the MX-80 from its manual, showing varied weights and widths of characters, as well as simple graphics

The case of the MX-80 measures roughly 12 by 15 by 4 inches (300 by 380 by 100 mm). Its pin-feed platen is adjustable, supporting tractor-feed paper between 4 and 10 inches (100 and 250 mm) wide. Its AC power supply is built into the chassis and does not require an external power adapter. The original version of the MX-80 printer requires the use of tractor-feed paper and lacks a friction-feed platen. Later variants of the MX-80 come with both a tractor-feed platen and a pin-feed platen, with the latter as a removable piece.

The MX-80 has a nominal printing speed of 80 characters per second (cps). It supports direct connection to computers via a Centronics parallel port. The printer's electronics contain a sufficient data buffer to allow the printhead to print bidirectionally—printing in the opposite direction immediately after reaching the end of one line—to minimize the printhead's seek time and maximize throughput. In addition, the MX-80's firmware ROM takes count of the length of each line printed as well as the position of the printhead on the paper to calculate exactly how much and in what direction the printhead needs to move to reach the start (or end) of the next line. This logical bidirectional printing increases throughput further. The MX-80 also detects special escape characters as part of its page description language, allowing the printhead to be tabbed over to specific areas on the page, useful for automated form filling.

Alternatively, Epson sold an optional RS-232 serial board, the Epson 8143, for connecting to computers that only had a DB-25 serial port. Direct connection to these computers via a serial port was disadvantageous because the MX-80 uses a non-standard implementation of the RS-232 pinout, reserving pins 11 and 20 of the DB-25 connector as clear-to-send lines for the computer to monitor. These clear-to-send lines are necessary to prevent the loss of characters during printing as the MX-80's data buffer lacks the ability to hold data while a carriage return, a line feed, or a form feed is performed during serial communication. Epson also sold an interface board for computers equipped with GPIB, most prominently the Commodore PET.

The MX-80's printhead is a 9-pin design, allowing for a maximum vertical resolution of nine dots per line. Across an eight-inch space, the MX-80 can print lines in densities of 40, 66, 80, or 132 columns. While textual characters are normally laid out in a 6 by 9 dot grid, the printer's ROM can have the printhead impact the paper in half-steps horizontally, allowing for slightly smoother letterforms. The MX-80 was the first printer on the market with disposable, user-serviceable printheads, with replacement heads costing roughly US$30 in 1980 (equivalent to $117 in 2025)—a fraction of the printer's original $650 cost (equivalent to $2,540 in 2025). The printhead is good for between 50 and 100 million character impressions; after its end-of-life, it can be disposed of and replaced by the user without needing tools. The printhead strikes a typewriter-style fabric ribbon, which can be reinked.

The MX-80 is capable of printing all 95 printable ASCII characters. The printer also supports printing block graphics characters from a set of 64 characters (corresponding to the TRS-80 character set). This allows for the creation of low-resolution graphical prints. A set of DIP switches on the back of the MX-80 can be flipped to switch out the stock ASCII character set with ones for other languages, including a Japanese katakana character set. By sending certain escape characters to the printer, text can be formatted in a multitude of ways, including varying the width and weight of each character. Weight can be increased by doublestriking each letter in one of two modes: "emphasized mode", in which the character is doublestruck after advancing the printhead the length of a half-dot; and "double-strike mode", in which the paper is advanced 1/216th of an inch and doublestruck.

== Graftrax ==
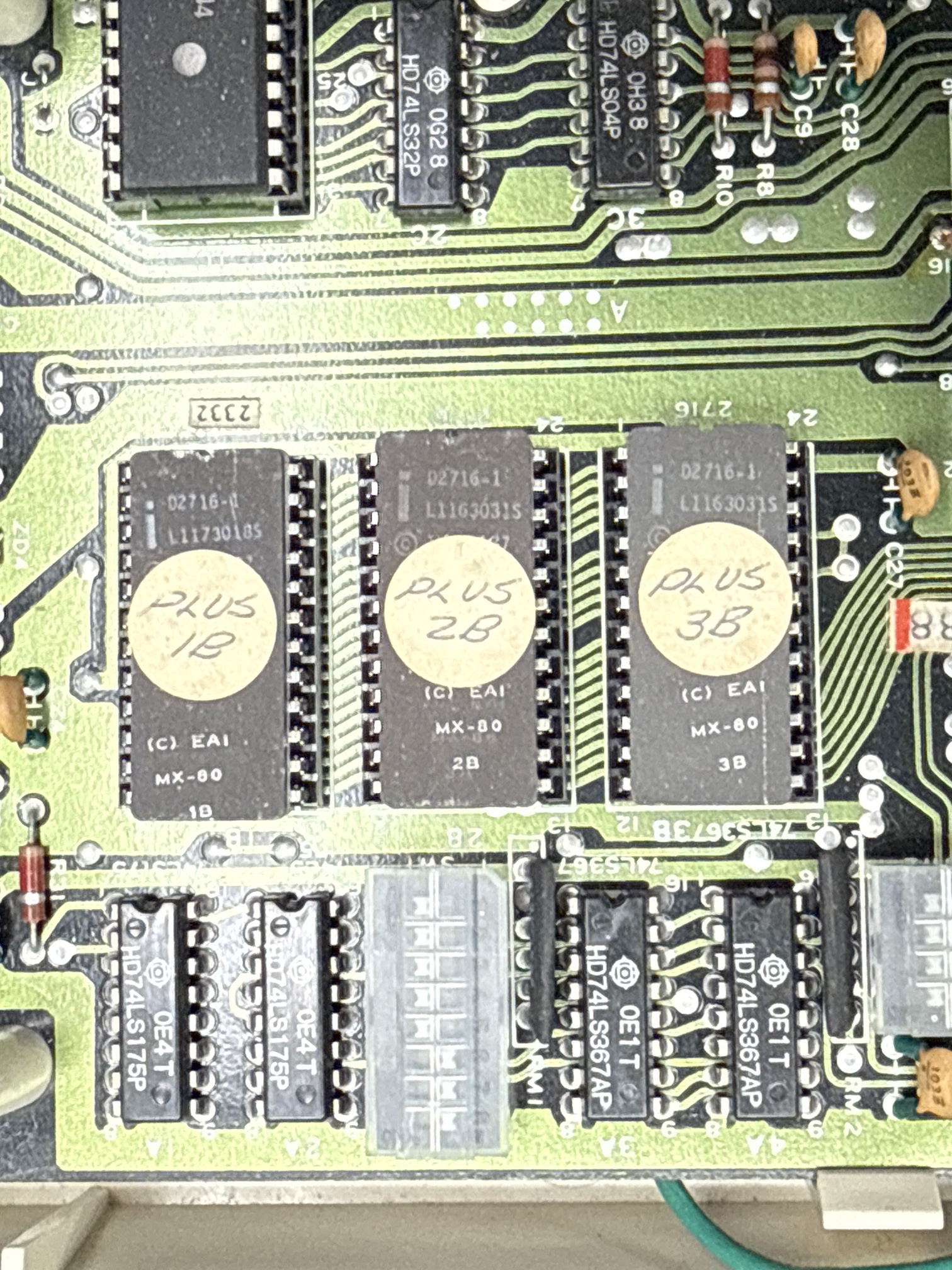
Graphtrax Plus EPROMs inside an MX-80 printer

Graftrax was a set of three EPROMs offered by Epson for the MX-80, enhancing the printer's functionality and behavior. The original Graftrax 80, released in 1981, added a high-resolution graphical printing mode with the ability to control each pin of the printhead arbitrarily to produce complex bitmap graphics. In addition, the Graftrax 80 added italics character sets for each font weight and width; software-redefinable escape characters, allowing end users to use the MX-80 with software meant for other printers; the ability to control the line height by increments of 1/216th of an inch; and the ability to change the formatting of text in the middle of a line, instead of having the entire line affected.

In 1982, Epson introduced Graftrax Plus, which dropped support for the TRS-80 block characters in favor of the ability to backspace, or to move the printhead backward the length of one character to (for example) doublestrike arbitrarily; added superscript, subscript, and true underline formatting (as opposed to typewriter-convention underlining, wherein the users doublestrikes letters with the underscore characters, often clashing with descenders); and added special international symbols such as the tilde (~), the unofficial franc symbol (₣), and the umlaut (¨).

== Other models ==
Epson released a number of variants of the MX-80 during the 1980s. Along with the flagship MX-80, these printers comprise the Epson MX series:

- MX-70 (early 1981) – a cost-reduced version of the MX-80 with unidirectional printing, a 7-pin printhead (with alphanumeric characters lacking descenders and half-step dot features), and the Graftrax II ROM set, the latter allowing for the printing out of high-resolution, arbitrary bitmap graphics;
- MX-80 F/T (early 1981) – a version of the MX-80 with a removable friction-feed platen, allowing the user to feed in plain loose-leaf paper, without the need for perforations; and
- MX-100 (June 1981) – a wide-format version of the MX-80 with a 15-inch pin-feed and friction-feed platen (capable of printing up to 233 columns of text), a high-resolution graphical printing mode, additional international character sets, adjustable right margins, and the ability to print on perforations.

Beginning in September 1981, IBM sold a badge-engineered version of Epson's MX-80 as the IBM 5152 Graphics Printer. It featured a modified firmware ROM with a different character set and a slightly altered PCL, as an accessory to their original IBM PC. IBM's contract with Epson briefly cornered the market for the MX-80 during the fall of 1981, leading to shortages of the printer among Epson's primary resellers.

Texas Instruments also sold a rebadged version of the MX-80 as the TI 99/4 Impact Printer (PHP 2500), featuring the Epson 8143 serial board, for the TI-99/4 and TI-99/4A home computers, introduced in 1982. The 8143 card was included as the original 99/4 supported only RS-232 serial communication through its sidecar expansion bus; its successor the 99/4A had a more versatile expansion system that supported parallel port cards.

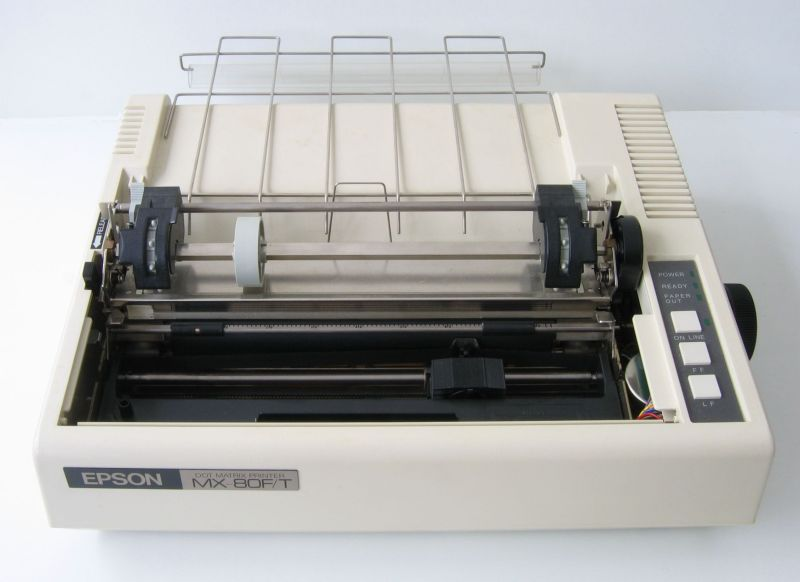
Epson MX-80 F/T, showing the added friction-feed platen

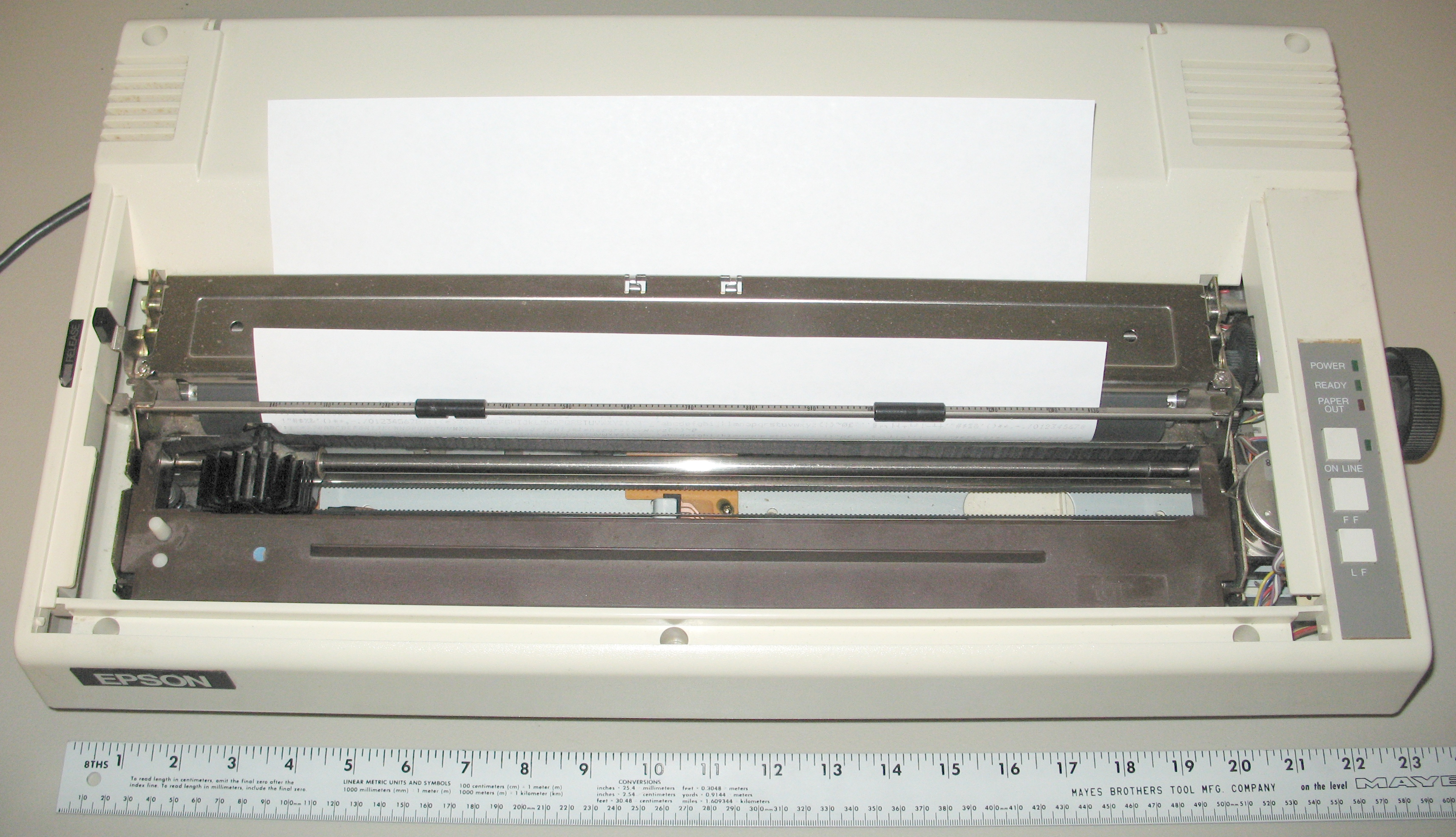
Epson MX-100, a wide-format version of the MX-80

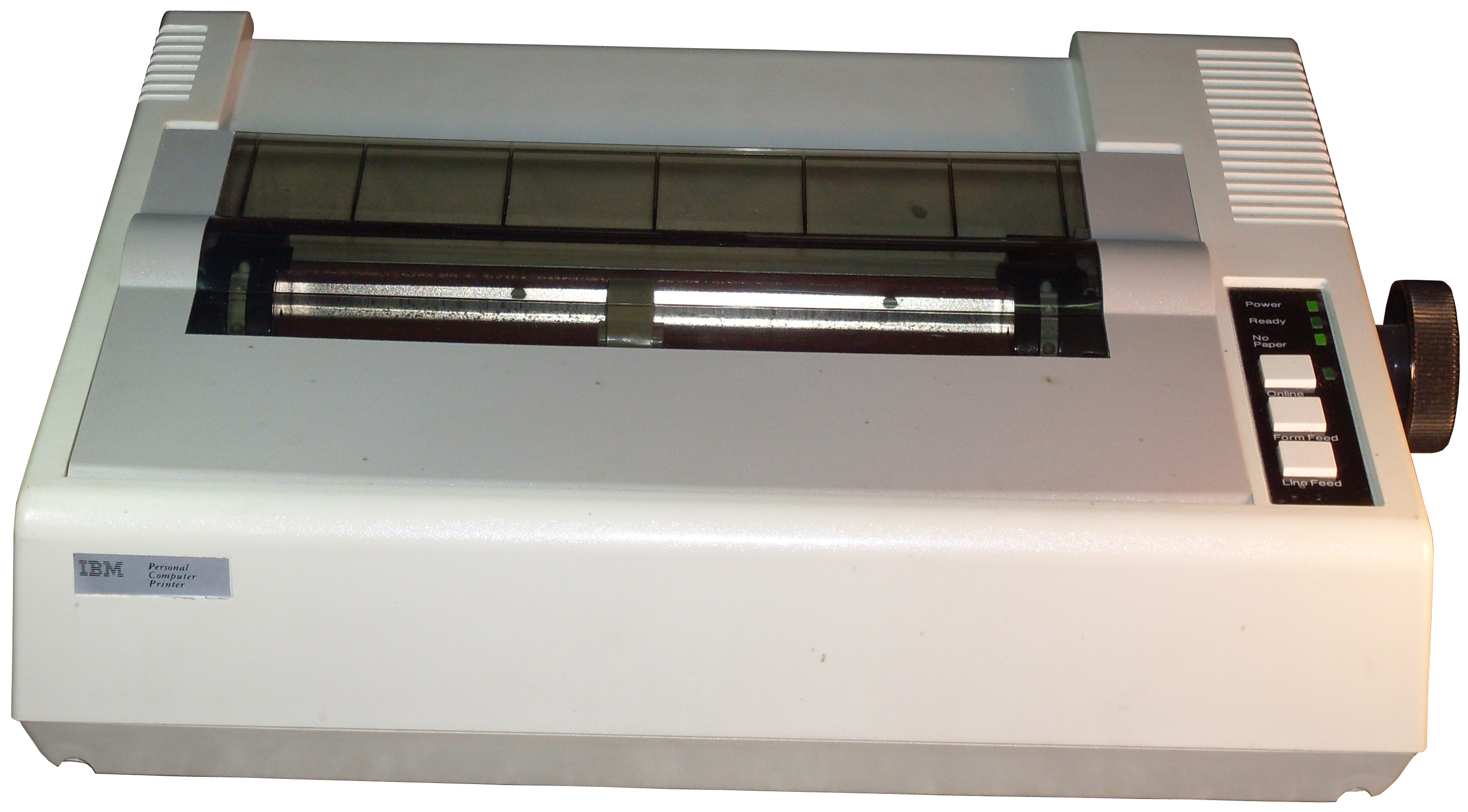
The IBM 5152 Graphics Printer, a rebadged version of Epson's MX-80

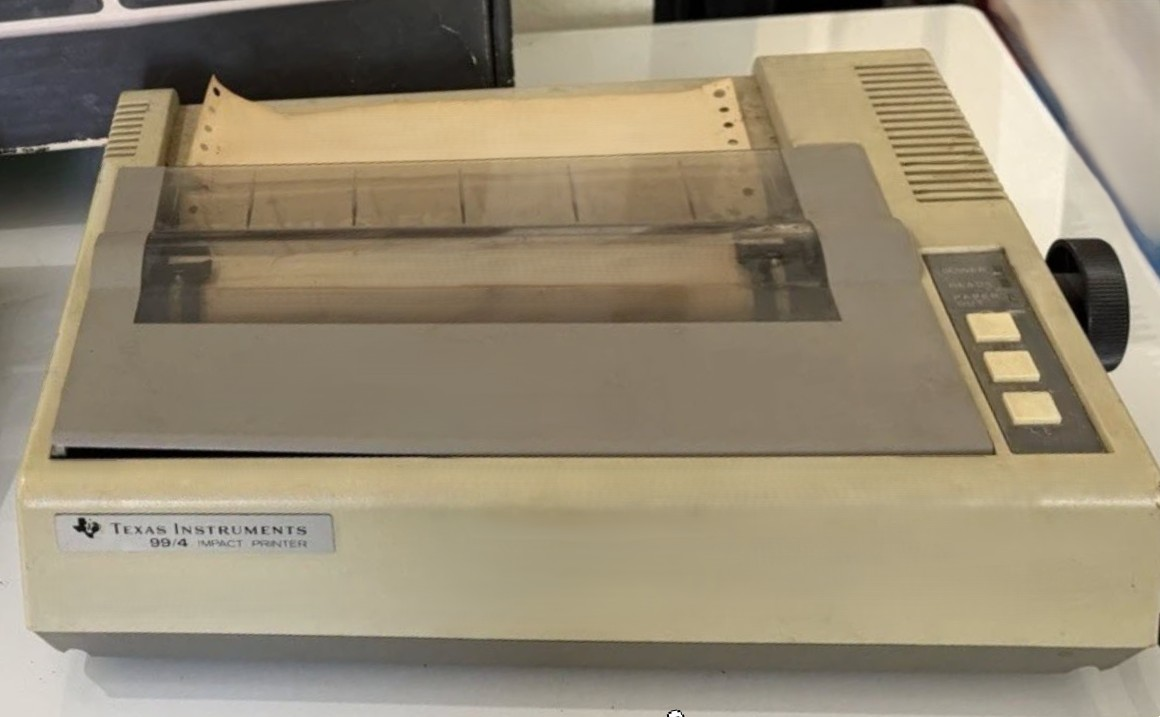
The TI-99/4 Impact Printer, a rebadged version of Epson's MX-80

== Sales and reception ==
The MX-80 was an immediate critical and commercial success for Epson, the company selling tens of thousands of units within two months of its introduction. Over 200 thousand MX-80s were sold throughout the entirety of 1981, with monthly production ramping up from 10,000 units a month in January 1981 to 40,000 units a month in October that year. By 1982 the MX-80 had captured half of the global market share for 80-column printers, with a 35-percent share in the United States, a 60-percent share in Europe, and a 70-percent share in Japan. It was the best-selling dot matrix printer for much of the 1980s, its global market share eventually peaking at 60 percent. It was one of the first printers to see widespread use in homes as well as in office environments, earning a reputation as a reliable workhorse. According to Frank J. Derfler in Kilobaud Microcomputing, it was so immediately popular that by mid-1981 it had spawned a number of users' group across the United States dedicated to the MX-80—a rarity for a computer peripheral, much less a printer. In a longform review for Kilobaud, Derfler wrote that the MX-80 "sets a high standard for dot matrix print quality" and was capable of withstanding heavy use.

By the end of the MX-80's lifespan in the mid-1980s, Epson had sold well over one million units of the printer. According to the Byte writers David and Richard Kater, the widespread adoption of the MX-80 was down to a mixture of the printer's low price, ease of use, and smart design, as well as Epson's marketing push and the concurrent meteoric growth of the personal computer market. The MX series of printers was retired in the mid-1980s, after Epson released its successor the FX-80 in 1983, featuring a wider platen, a faster printhead, a larger data buffer, user-definable character sets for custom symbols and typefaces, and more.

== Legacy ==
After the MX-80, computer printers kept getting better while dropping in price. Manufacturers figured out how to pack more pins into the print heads, and 9-pin printers became the standard, replacing the 7-pin models. High-speed 120- to 180-cps dot matrix draft output, and near-letter-quality (NLQ) printing at lower speeds soon became common. NLQ printing was good enough that high-cost daisy wheel printers became virtually obsolete for most applications.

— Stan Veit, Computer Shopper

The MX-80 was widely cloned by other manufacturers, with its form factor and functionality quickly becoming a de facto standard for nearly all dot matrix printers that followed it. A market for printer accelerator boards and other accessories designed specifically for the MX-80 also sprang up after its release, while its page description language was heavily borrowed by other printer manufacturers and software developers in the industry. This PCL was eventually codified in the early 1980s by Epson as ESC/P and received a number of updates over the years, increasing its feature set.

The MX-80 kicked off intense competition in the dot matrix printer industry and led to 9-pin printers becoming the baseline standard for print fidelity, with 7-pin designs such as the Centronics Model 779 becoming obsolete and 15-pin designs representing the cutting edge. With rapid advancements to the precision of printing mechanisms resulting from this competition, dot matrix printers began offering near-letter-quality (NLQ) printing modes, with the quality of printouts rivaling that of daisy wheel printers—the predominant alternative printing technology at the time—making dot matrix printers appropriate for formal office correspondence as opposed to purely technical work for the first time. Not only were NLQ-equipped printers faster and lower cost than daisy wheel printers, they could also produce high-quality graphics, while daisy wheel printers could not. By the early 1990s, daisy wheel printers had all but disappeared from the market.

The MX-80 was named by PC World's Christopher Null as the 42nd greatest technology product of all time in 2007, noting that aftermarket ink ribbons for the MX-80 were still being sold nearly 30 years after its release as a testament to its popularity. Veit called the MX-80 a "landmark in computer history".
