= HP Linux Imaging and Printing =

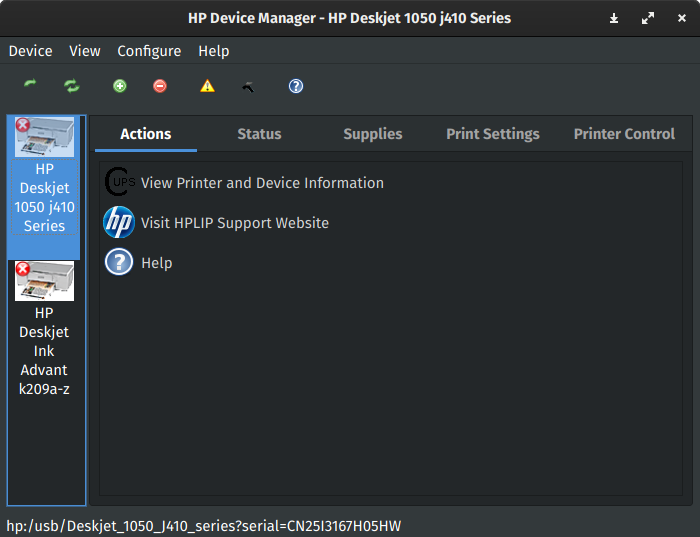
- Screenshot of the HPLIP toolbox.
- Stable release: 3.26.4 / 20 May 2026; 42 days ago
- Written in: Python, C/C++
- Operating system: Linux (most flavors and distributions), OpenBSD
- Platform: Source files provided; packaged for Ubuntu, Fedora, OpenSUSE, Debian, Linux Mint, RHEL, Boss, OpenBSD
- Available in: English only
- Type: Printing and scanning
- License: GPLv2 MIT BSD
- Website: hp.io/hplip
- Repository: sourceforge.net/projects/hplip/files/hplip/

The HPLIP ("HP Linux Imaging and Printing") project—initiated and led by HP Inc. (HP)—aims to ease Linux systems' ability to interact with HP's inkjet and laser printers with full printing, scanning, and faxing support. As of 2021 the supplied printer-drivers support a total of 3,088 HP printer models; many of these for low-end models are free and open-source (FOSS), licensed under MIT, BSD, and GPL licenses, but others (including all color laser MFC printers on the market for years) require proprietary binary blobs ("plug-ins"). The project intends that HPLIP work in combination with CUPS (Common UNIX Printing System) and SANE to perform printing and scanning respectively. HPOJ, the HP OfficeJet Linux driver to get HP's OfficeJet printers to run with Linux, ceased development as of 13 March 2006 with the advent of HPLIP.

== Tools ==
Tools include:

- an automated installer compatible with many different Linux distributions
- a graphical toolbox tool and faxing applications written in Qt which allow device configuration and various actions like printing and scanning
- a number of command-line utilities to configure and add devices, as well as to scan and print

== Implementation ==
HPLIP co-operates with hpiod processes and files.

== Support ==
HP offers help and support for HPLIP.
