= QR-Tekst =

- Screenshot of QR-Tekst 2.0 for Windows, demonstrating the formatting and image embedding capabilities. The yellow icons on the margins allow to modify the style of the entire page or individual paragraphs.
- Developer: Malkom
- Final release: 2.0 / 1995
- Operating system: MS-DOS, UNIX, Microsoft Windows
- Type: Word processor
- License: Proprietary

QR-Tekst is a word processing program developed by the Polish company Malkom. It was originally released for MS-DOS and UNIX, and later for Microsoft Windows. Version 2.0 for Windows was the final release; the program is no longer being developed.

The program saw widespread use in Polish government offices. By early 1992, it had already been in use for several years in the Chancellery of the Sejm, and a formal government contract designated QR-Tekst as the standard text editor for government use.

== History ==
QR-Tekst was originally developed for MS-DOS. The first Windows version was demonstrated at the 1993 editions of the CeBIT and Infosystem '93 trade fairs, and became available for purchase in late October 1993. Version 2.0 for Windows was first demonstrated in 1995.

== Features ==
Features offered by the program include: spell checker and thesaurus, table of contents generation, macro support, and mail merge functionality. The native QR-Tekst format supports tables and embedded images. The program can also read multiple text document formats popular at the time of its release, including those of ChiWriter and the Polish program TAG.

== Reception ==
QR-Tekst received positive reviews in Poland. Version 5.0.0 for MS-DOS was reviewed in Bajtek, where it was praised for its features, although the reviewer criticized the scant documentation. The first Windows release also received a favorable review in Bajtek, with particular praise for its features and user interface. The reviewer noted that the program was particularly well suited for Polish users, due to its native Polish interface, spellchecker, and thesaurus, as well as text wrapping rules adapted to Polish typography conventions.

Version 5.1 for MS-DOS was reviewed in the Enter magazine. The program was positively rated for its capabilities and ease of use, and was named the Polish-language text editor for MS-DOS.

In 1992, QR-Tekst was a finalist in the "Software for Europe" contest organized by IDG. In 1993, it was named "Product of the Year" by the Polish magazine PCKurier. In the 3/1994 issue of Enter, QR-Tekst was named "Enter's Choice". In 1994, Malkom received the Teraz Polska award, recognizing outstanding Polish brands, for its work on QR-Tekst.
