= UPD =

UPD may refer to:

== Political parties ==
- Union for Development, a political party in Macao
- Union for Peace and Development, a political party in Burundi
- Union, Progress and Democracy, a political party in Spain

== Science and technology ==
- Underpotential deposition, electrodeposition of a metal
- Uniparental disomy, chromosomal abnormality
- HP Universal Print Driver, LaserJet print driver by Hewlett-Packard

== Commerce ==
- United Pharmaceutical Distributors, a delivery service and subsidiary of South African healthcare and personal care company Clicks

== Other ==
- Uma Musume Pretty Derby, a Japanese multimedia franchise
- Unified Police Department of Greater Salt Lake
- Urban planned development, a governmental designation for an urban village-style planned community
- University of the Philippines Diliman, the flagship university of the University of the Philippines System
- University Police Department, on-campus police force at a university
