= ESC/P =

Page description language developed by Epson

ESC/P, short for Epson Standard Code for Printers and sometimes styled Escape/P, is a page description language developed by Epson to control computer printers. It was mainly used in Epson's dot matrix printers, beginning with the MX-80 in 1980, as well as some of the company's inkjet printers. It is still widely used in many receipt thermal printers. During the era of dot matrix printers, it was also used by other manufacturers (e.g., NEC), sometimes in modified form. At the time, it was a popular mechanism to add formatting to printed text, and was widely supported in software.

== Derivation ==
ESC/P derives its name from the start of the escape sequences used, which start with the escape character ESC (ASCII code 27). As an example, ESC E will switch to printing in bold font, while ESC F switches off bold printing. The ESC/P control codes are sometimes also referred to as Epson LQ codes, as they were made popular by the Epson LQ series of dot matrix printers, even though ESC/P was introduced long before LQ printers.

== Variants ==
There are several variants of ESC/P, as not all printers implement all commands.

- **ESC/P J84** adds special support for Japanese computers.
- **ESC/P2** is a more recent variant of ESC/P by Epson. ESC/P2 is backward compatible with ESC/P, but adds commands for new printer features such as scalable fonts and enhanced graphics printing.
- **ESC/P-R** is a variant now used by Epson on many inkjet printers.
- **ESC/POS** is a variant for controlling receipt printers as commonly used at the point of sale (POS).
- **ESC/P-K** adds special support for Chinese computers.

== Current printers ==
As of 2014, few modern/office/consumer non-Epson printers use ESC/P; instead most are driven through a standardized page description language, usually PCL or PostScript, or they use proprietary protocols such as Hardware Code Pages.

Many current thermal receipt printers still continue to use the ESC/POS command set.

All current Epson impact printers still support ESC/P , all current Epson receipt/thermal printers support ESC/POS and some Epson Stylus inkjets still seem to be using some variant of ESC/P. See the Gutenprint (Gimp Print) project for source code examples.

== See also ==
- Hardware code page
- Printer driver
- CUPS Apple MacOS/Linux printing subsystem
