= ChiWriter =

Scientific word processing software

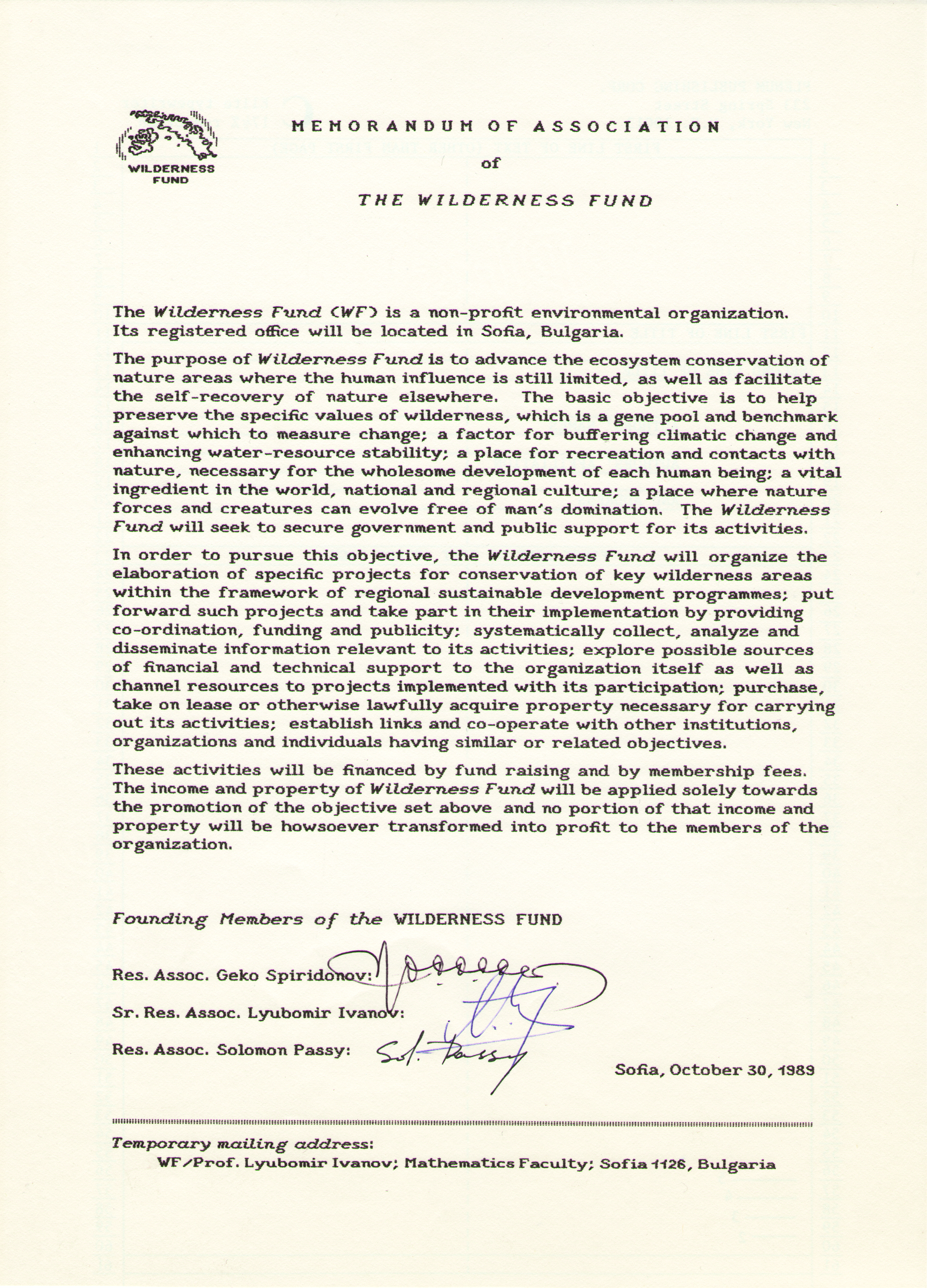
- A document published in 1989, using ChiWriter with user-designed fonts.
- Developer: Cay Horstmann
- Initial release: 1986; 40 years ago
- Final release: 4.20B / 1993
- Written in: C
- Operating system: MS-DOS
- Type: Word processor
- License: Proprietary

ChiWriter was a scientific word processor for MS-DOS, created by Cay Horstmann and released commercially in 1986.

It was one of the first WYSIWYG word processors that could write mathematical formulas, even on IBM PC XT computers. It was easier to use than TeX. It was relatively affordable and ran on personal computers, unlike TeX, which ran on expensive Unix computers.

ChiWriter was discontinued in 1996. Since then, Horstmann has placed the ChiWriter executable in the public domain. The source is unpublished.

== Operation ==
ChiWriter let a user write text that was subscripted or superscripted with respect to the current text line (above or below, by half the base line height). This text was treated as part of the core line, enabling complex formulae, such as fractions. It supported up to 20 fonts simultaneously, including fonts with Greek, Cyrillic, and mathematical symbols. Users could combine symbols to create larger objects, such as sums and integrals. Thus, ChiWriter facilitated writing mathematical and scientific texts.

It was easier to use than TeX, making it popular with scientists. It focused on speed of use and on interactive editing, rather than on control over styling.

Though it was a DOS application, it used graphics display modes, implementing its own GUI. It used its own with fixed width, bitmap fonts (not vector fonts). Every font had the same fixed dimensions, but different sets were available for different output devices (for example, low-resolution fonts for video displays and high-resolution fonts for printers). A font editor allowed one to modify fonts and to add user-designed symbols and new fonts, including proportional fonts.

== History ==
In 1988, Horstmann Software Design Corporation was advertising ChiWriter as "completely 'what-you-see-is-what-you-get'" along with several optional components, such as support for graphics beyond EGA, 24-pin dot-matrix printers, and laser printers. A combination of market forces led to the company's demise. In 2001, (Note: The Internet Archive's earliest timestamp for the web page that once contained this text is 23 September 2001 (and the snapshot was taken on 31 January 2002). But the page may have existed earlier and the quoted words may have been present in those earlier versions.) Horstmann wrote:

Q: Why was there never a Windows version of ChiWriter?

A: In a word, we ran out of money. A team of four programmers was working on the Windows version, when the Windows 3.0 popularity made DOS programs hard to sell. When sales dropped, we had to lay off the programmers one by one. At the same time, Microsoft Word became more powerful and set a minimum standard for what a word processor would need to deliver. The "suite wars" that put a word processor on many computers for free didn't help. Eventually, we just had to throw in the towel.

== Access to old ChiWriter documents today ==
=== Via conversion to TeX ===
Horstmann Software Design sold a ChiWriter-to-TeX converter. This is not available from Horstmann's website.

=== Via laser output ===
As of 2020, ChiWriter can run on modern computers, in a virtual machine running DOS. Virtualizers known to work include VirtualBox and DosBox. Once ChiWriter is running, assuming it has the laser printing option, use it to output a PostScript (*.ps) file from each document. PostScript is readily convertible to PDF.

=== Via dot-matrix output ===
ChiPBM is a program written by Dmitry Zaitsev, to convert dot-matrix output from ChiWriter. It understands the subset of Epson ESC/P codes emitted by ChiWriter, and outputs portable bitmap data (PBM). This is an output format for graphics, that is still used in 2025.

ChiPBM was announced by Zaitsev in February 2017, through self-promotion on Wikipedia. It is apparently freeware: the source code seems unpublished and the executable can be downloaded free of charge. (Note: HTTP header fields, from the ChiPBM executable's URL, accessed on 26 December 2025: Content-Type: application/x-msdownload Last-Modified: Sat, 17 Jun 2023 18:02:33 GMT ETag: 21355-5fe571b136bb1 Content-Length: 136021) As of December 2025, the ChiPBM executable on Zaitsev's website is built for x86-64 computers running Microsoft Windows. There is no manual.
