= Easy Software Products =

American software company

- Industry: software
- Founded: 1993
- Founder: Michael Sweet
- Defunct: 1 December 2011
- Headquarters: Washington, D.C.
- Products: CUPS (Common Unix Printing System); HTMLDOC software
- Website: easysw.com at the Wayback Machine (archived 2005-02-04)

Easy Software Products was the vendor who originally invented CUPS (Common Unix Printing System) and HTMLDOC software. It was founded near Washington, D.C. in 1993 and was located in Morgan Hill, California. ESP sold CUPS to Apple Inc. in 2007, but still developed and sold its HTMLDOC software until its closure.

The company was shut down on December 1, 2011.
