= TurboPrint =

Printer driver system for Linux and Amiga

- Developer(s): Stefan Donhauser, Florian Zeiler
- Initial release: 1988; 37 years ago
- Stable release: 7.60 (Amiga), 2.57 (Linux) / September 20, 2023; 18 months ago
- Operating system: AmigaOS, Linux (x86, x64, ARM), Mac OS X, MorphOS
- Type: Print server
- License: Proprietary
- Website: www.irseesoft.de www.turboprint.info www.printfab.net

The structure of TurboPrint

TurboPrint is a closed source printer driver system for Linux, AmigaOS and MorphOS. It supports a number of printers that don't yet have a free driver, and fuller printer functionality on some printer models. In recent versions, it integrates with the CUPS printing system.

== Bibliography ==
- Carla Schroder (December 16, 2009), TurboPrint for Linux Saves the Day-- Again, linuxplanet.com
- A. Lizard, (November 06, 2006) Turning SLED10 Linux Into a Practical User Desktop, Dr. Dobb's
- (in German) Michael Kofler, Jetzt lerne ich Linux im Büro: Office-Aufgaben einfach und sicher unter Linux meistern, Pearson Education, 2004, ISBN 3-8272-6782-X, p. 95
- (in German) Andreas Proschofsky, Turboprint 2: Professionelle Linux-Drucker-Treiber in neuer Version, 8 July 2008, Der Standard
- (in French) Christian Verhille, Mandriva Linux 2007, pp. 278-280, Editions ENI, 2006, ISBN 2-7460-3444-1
- Fulvio Peruggi (2007), TurboPrint 7.60 on MorphOS
