= Stan Veit =

American entrepreneur and publisher (1919-2010)

Stan Veit (25 December 1919 – 29 July 2010) was an entrepreneur and publisher. He ran "Computer Mart", the first computer store in New York City, was the personal computer editor of Popular Electronics magazine, and then Editor-in-Chief of Computer Shopper. He published his reminiscences about the early history of the personal computer industry in a 1993 book called Stan Veit's History of the Personal Computer.

== Biography ==
=== Early life ===
Veit studied at Brooklyn Polytechnic Institute, RCA Institutes, Hofstra College, and received a bachelor's degree in education from New School University. He served in the U.S. Army Air Corps in World War II. He then worked as a technical writer for a number of defense contractors.

=== Career ===
In 1976 he opened Computer Mart of New York. This was one of the first computer stores in the world. It sold computers from Imsai, Sphere Computers, South West Technical Products, and Apple Computer, among others. It was the third Apple dealer appointed by Steve Jobs. Between 1976 and 1979, he was involved with Steve Jobs, Charles Tandy, and Les Solomon, with whom he co-authored the book Getting Involved With Your Own Computer.

Veit became a writer and editor, publishing Using Microcomputers In Business, The Peripherals Book, and articles for Personal Computing and Byte magazines. In 1980, he became the computer editor of Popular Electronics magazine and later technical editor of Computers & Electronics magazine for Ziff Davis. He also became sysop of Ziff Davis' first online magazine on CompuServe.

In 1983, he became the founding editor-in-chief of Computer Shopper magazine and later editor-in-chief and publisher.
