= JetDirect =

Network printer technology

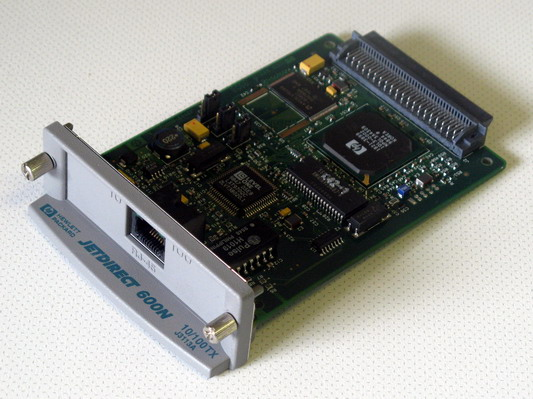
- JetDirect 600n card
- Manufacturer: Hewlett-Packard
- Introduced: March 1991; 35 years ago
- Type: Print server
- Connection: Ethernet; Token Ring; Bluetooth; IEEE 802.11 Wi-Fi (b and g)

JetDirect is a line of external print servers formerly sold by Hewlett-Packard (HP). The JetDirect allows computer printers to be directly attached to a local area network.

== History ==
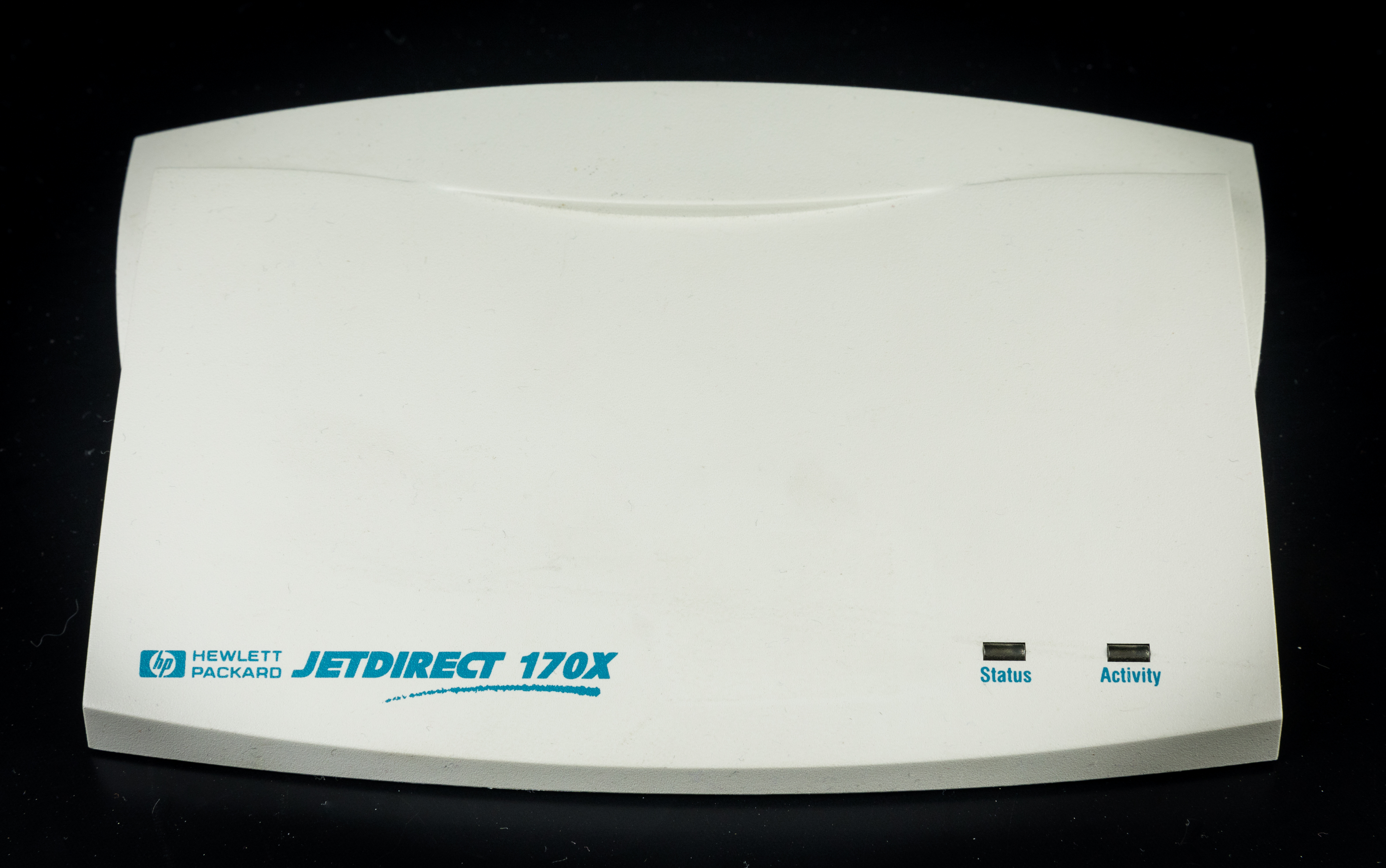

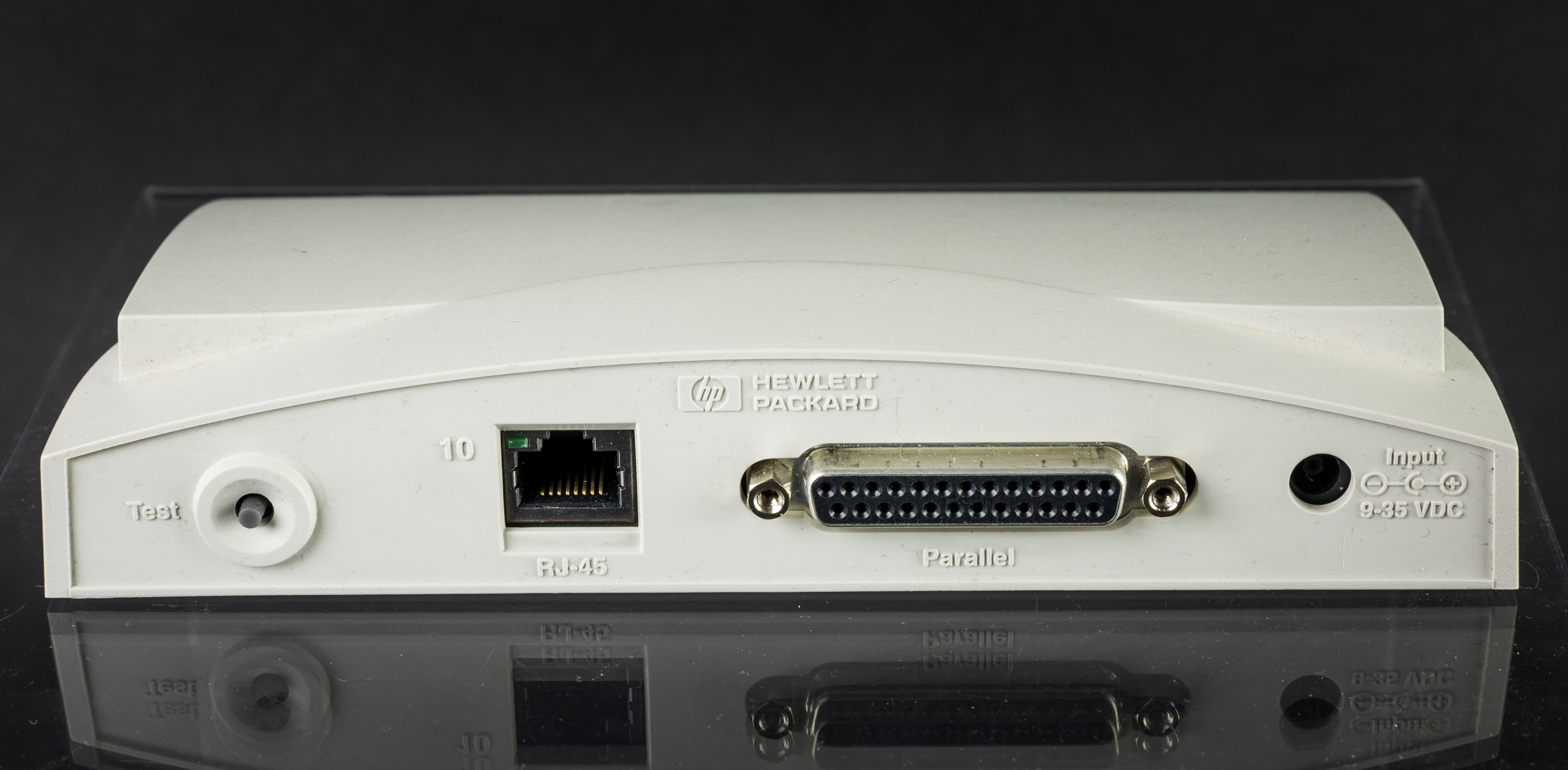
External print server JetDirect 170X with LAN and parallel printer ports

== Protocols ==
More advanced versions of JetDirect supported a number of network printing protocols. However, the protocol that ended up being associated with it, the JetDirect protocol, is its raw TCP/IP protocol sometimes referred to as Socket API or RAW. It is an extremely simple network printing protocol. Submitting a print job can be done by netcating a file containing the page description language (e.g. PostScript, PCL) to the appropriate TCP port on the printer (default port is 9100). Information about the printer and job is simply sent to the client while the TCP connection is active. The port would reject connections if the printer is busy.

AppSocket is a very similar implementation by Tektronix for Phaser printers, later sold to Xerox. This protocol adds support for querying for printer status by non-printing users via a separate UDP port.

Most JetDirect devices also came with, JetDirect Interface, a telnet interface for configuring the device or printer.

== Internal print servers ==
=== EIO ===
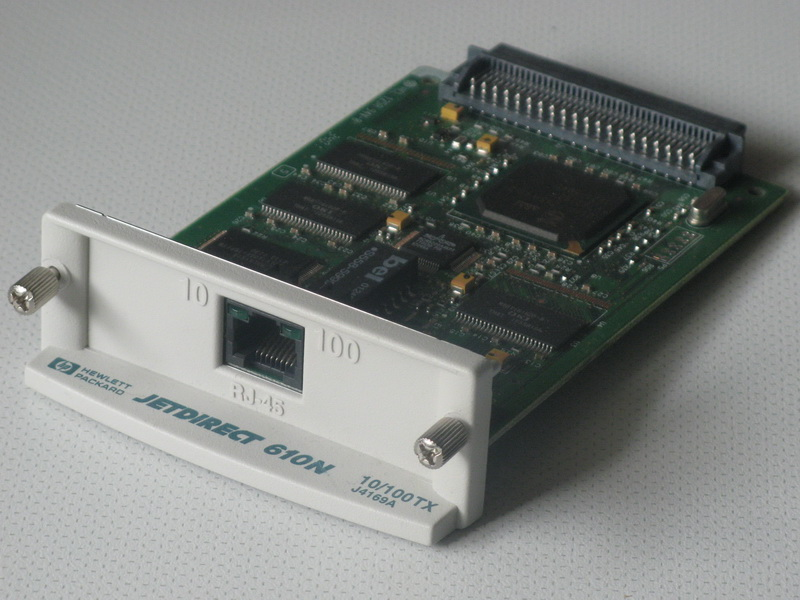
JetDirect 610n card

EIO (Enhanced Input/Output) is a modular interface developed by HP for its printers to expand their capabilities. EIO does not just serve JetDirect cards, but EIO hard drives and the EIO Connectivity card for adding communication ports to the printers as well. EIO utilizes the 3.3V signaling technology of the Conventional PCI bus and is significantly more energy-efficient than MIO technology. EIO print servers will not work in LIO slots, nor will the LIO print servers work in EIO slots.

- 1284B Parallel Card (J7972G) - Provides one Type C Mini-Centronics 36-pin parallel port.
- 600n – 10/100BASE-TX/10BASE2/LocalTalk (J3110A, J3111A, J3112A, J3113A) (Discontinued)
- 610n – Ethernet/Fast Ethernet/802.5, DE9, 8-pin Modular (J4169A, J4167A) (Discontinued)
- 615n – Ethernet/Fast Ethernet (10/100BASE-TX, 802.3) (J6057A) (Discontinued)
- 620n – Ethernet/Fast Ethernet (10/100BASE-TX, 802.3) (J7934A, J7934G)
- 625n – Ethernet/Fast Ethernet/Gigabit (10/100/1000BASE-TX, 802.3) (J7960A, J7960G) (Discontinued)
- 630n – Ethernet/Fast Etnernet/Gigabit (10/100/1000BASE-Tx, 802.3) IPv6 (J7997G) replacement for 625n (Discontinued)
- 635n – Ethernet/Fast Ethernet/Gigabit (10/100/1000BASE-TX, 802.3) IPv6/IPsec (J7961A, J7961G) (Discontinued)
- 640n - Ethernet/Fast Ethernet/Gigabit (10/100/1000BASE-TX, 802.3) IPv6/IPsec (J8025A)
- 680n – 802.11b Wireless (Discontinued)
- 690n – Ethernet/Fast Ethernet/Wireless (10/100BASE-TX, 802.3, 802.11b/g) IPv6/IPsec (J8007G) (Discontinued)
- 695nw - Ethernet/Fast Ethernet/Gigabit/Wireless (10/100/1000BASE-TX, 802.3, 802.11b/g/n) IPv6/IPsec (J8024A)

=== 615n series ASIC issue ===
Any 615n series card can fail, but it is up to HP to determine if the failure is due to the chipset or some other factor. HP recommended to call them or contact them through the Web site and they will proceed to do some simple troubleshooting steps to determine if the failure is due to the chipset or some other cause.
