= Xprint =

Printing extension for X Window System

Xprint is a deprecated printing extension for the X Window System. It allows an application to render output to a printer just as it would to any other display device. The server portion, Xprt, uses an extension (XpExtension) to handle paged output devices. Xprint outputs as PostScript, PCL 3, PCL 5 or as a raster bitmap at printer resolution.

Xprint is based on ISO 10175 and other specifications.

Some applications and frameworks supporting Xprint include Mozilla and Mozilla Firefox, and the Qt, Athena, Motif and LessTif toolkits.

Xprint was first introduced in X11R6.3, rewritten for inclusion with X11R6.8 and removed from X.Org Server in May 2008. Xprint is now available from a separate repository.
