= Berkeley printing system =

Printing subsystem of BSD operating system

The Berkeley printing system is one of several standard architectures for printing on the Unix platform. It originated in 4.2BSD, and is still used to varying degrees in BSD derivatives such as FreeBSD, NetBSD, OpenBSD, and DragonFly BSD. A system running this print architecture could traditionally be identified by the use of the user command lpr as the primary interface to the print system, as opposed to the System V printing system lp command.

Typical user commands available to the Berkeley print system are:

- lpr — the user command to assign a job to the print queue
- lpq — shows the current print queue
- lprm — deletes a job from the print queue

The lpd program is the daemon with which those programs communicate.

These programs support the line printer daemon protocol, so that other machines on a network can submit jobs to a print queue on a machine running the Berkeley printing system, and so that the Berkeley printing system user commands can submit jobs to machines that support that protocol.

== See also ==
- CUPS
- LPRng
