= LPRng =

Implementation of the Berkeley LPR print spooler

- Original author: Patrick Powell
- Developers: Bernhard R. Link, Walter Harms and the community
- Stable release: 3.9.0 / May 15, 2019; 7 years ago
- Written in: C
- Operating system: Unix-like
- License: GNU GPL or Artistic License
- Website: lprng.sf.net
- Repository: sf.net/p/lprng/lprng/

LPRng is an open-source printing system compatible with the Berkeley printing system and implemented by many open-source Unix-like operating systems. It provides printer spooling and network print server functionality using the Line Printer Daemon protocol.

It was abandoned by its author in early 2005, then picked back up by new developers in October 2006 and hosted on SourceForge.

The latest release is 3.9.0, which was made available on May 15, 2019.

== See also ==
- CUPS
- System V printing system
