= Print server =

Server that connects printers to client computers over a network

In computer networking, a print server, or printer server, is a type of server that connects printers to client computers over a network. It accepts print jobs from the computers and sends the jobs to the appropriate printers, queuing the jobs locally to accommodate the fact that work may arrive more quickly than the printer can actually handle. Ancillary functions include the ability to inspect the queue of jobs to be processed, the ability to reorder or delete waiting print jobs, or the ability to do various kinds of accounting (such as counting pages, which may involve reading data generated by the printer(s)). Print servers may be used to enforce administration policies, such as color printing quotas, user/department authentication, or watermarking printed documents.

Print servers may support a variety of industry-standard or proprietary printing protocols including Internet Printing Protocol, Line Printer Daemon protocol, NetWare, NetBIOS/NetBEUI, or JetDirect.

A print server may be a networked computer with one or more shared printers. Alternatively, a print server may be a dedicated device on the network, with connections to the LAN and one or more printers. Dedicated server appliances tend to be fairly simple in both configuration and features. Print server functionality may be integrated with other devices such as a wireless router, a firewall, or both. A printer may have a built-in print server.

All printers with the right type of connector are compatible with all print servers; manufacturers of servers make available lists of compatible printers because a server may not implement all the communications functionality of a printer (e.g. low ink signal).

Network printer servers
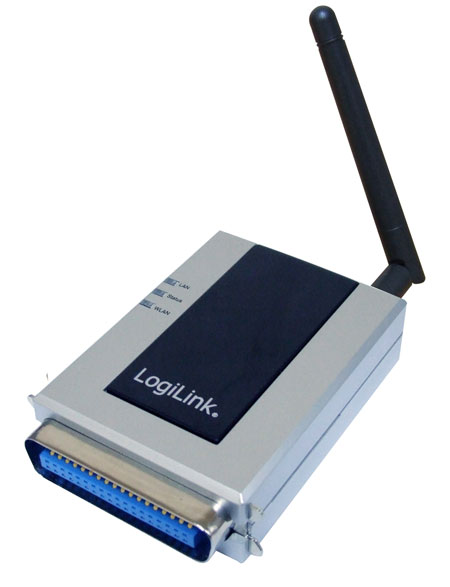
A wireless print server

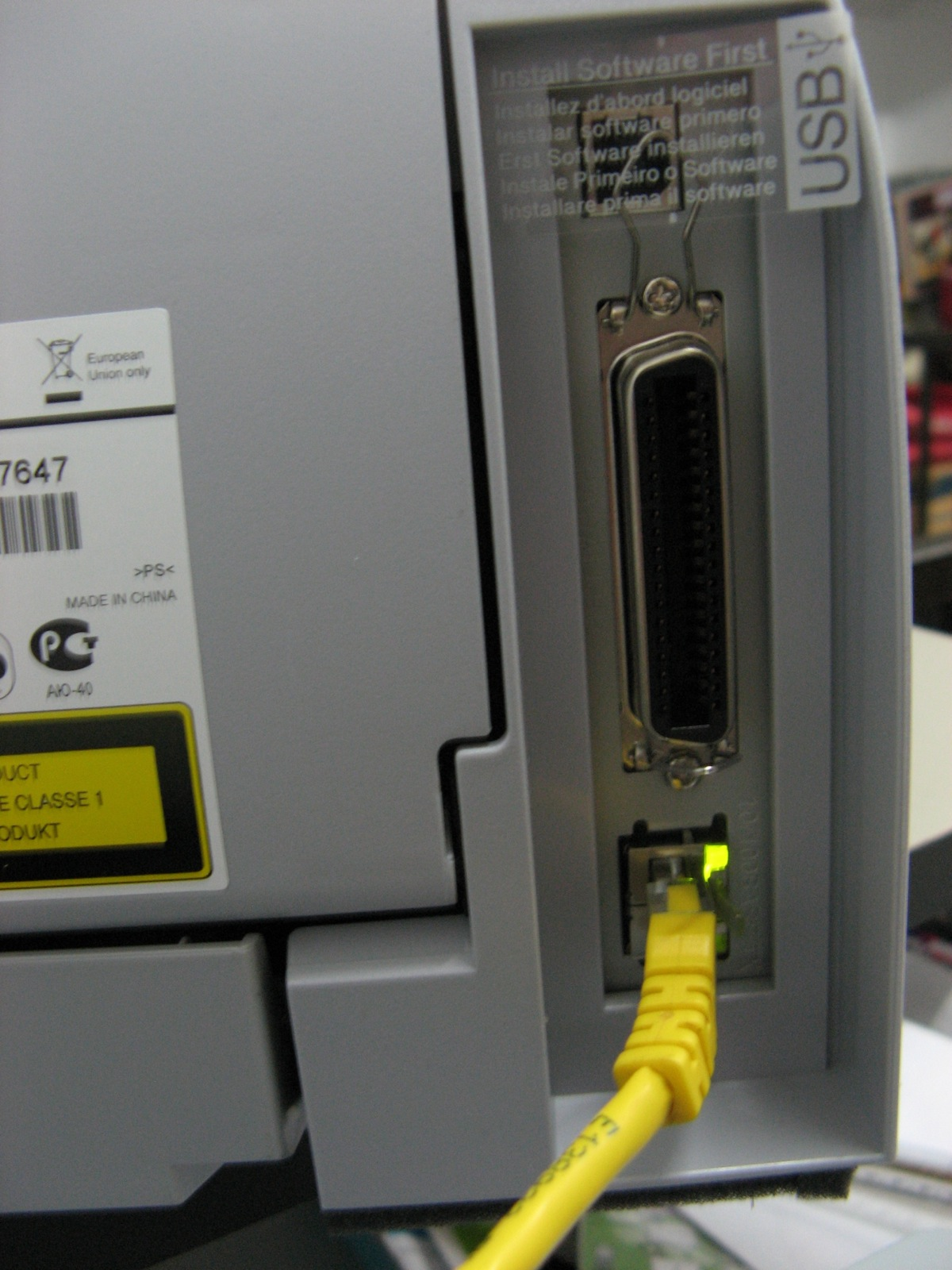
Brother HL-2070N network laser printer with built-in print server

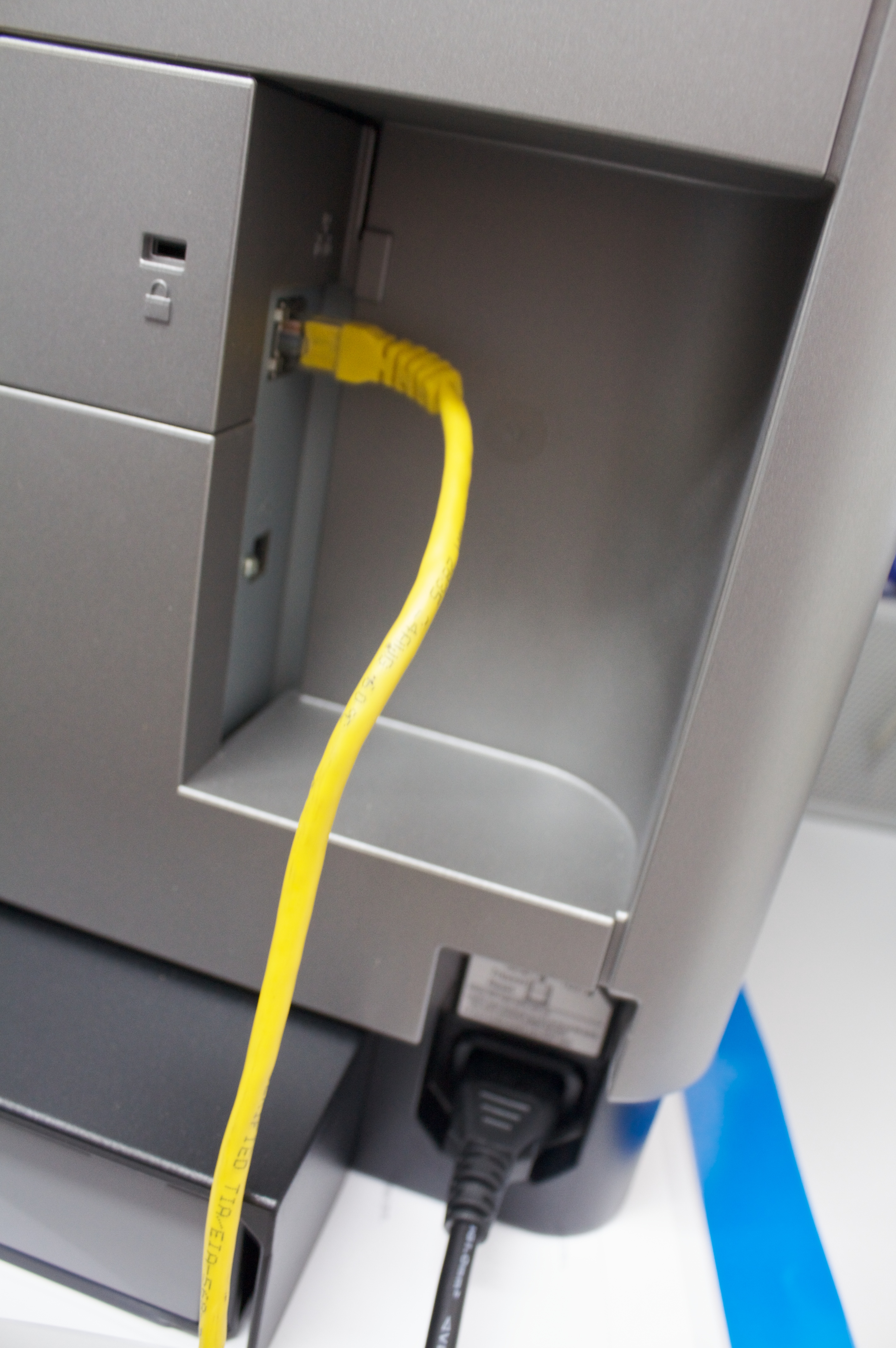
Dell 1320cn color laser network printer with network connection

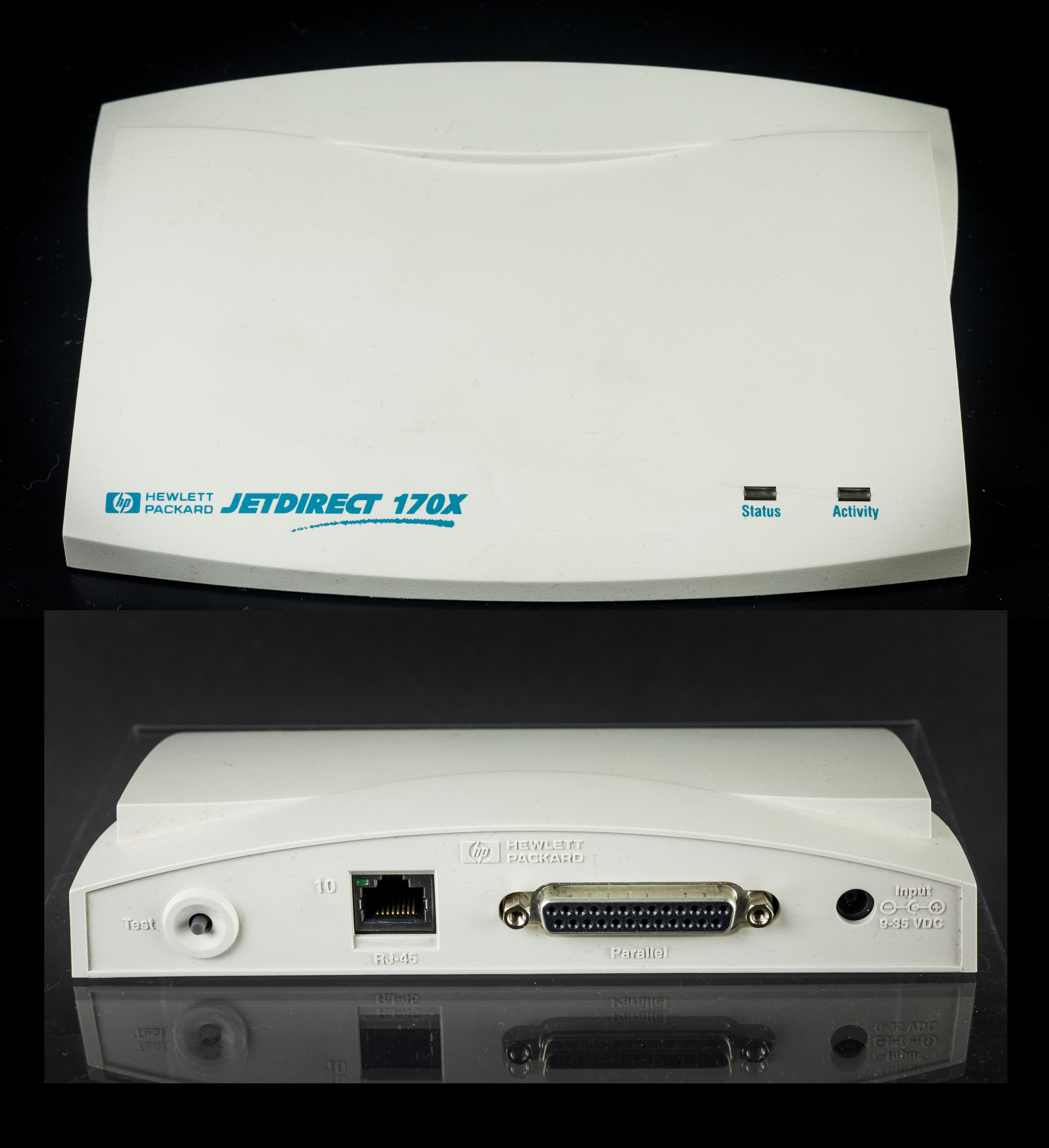
External print server HP JetDirect 170X with LAN and parallel printer ports

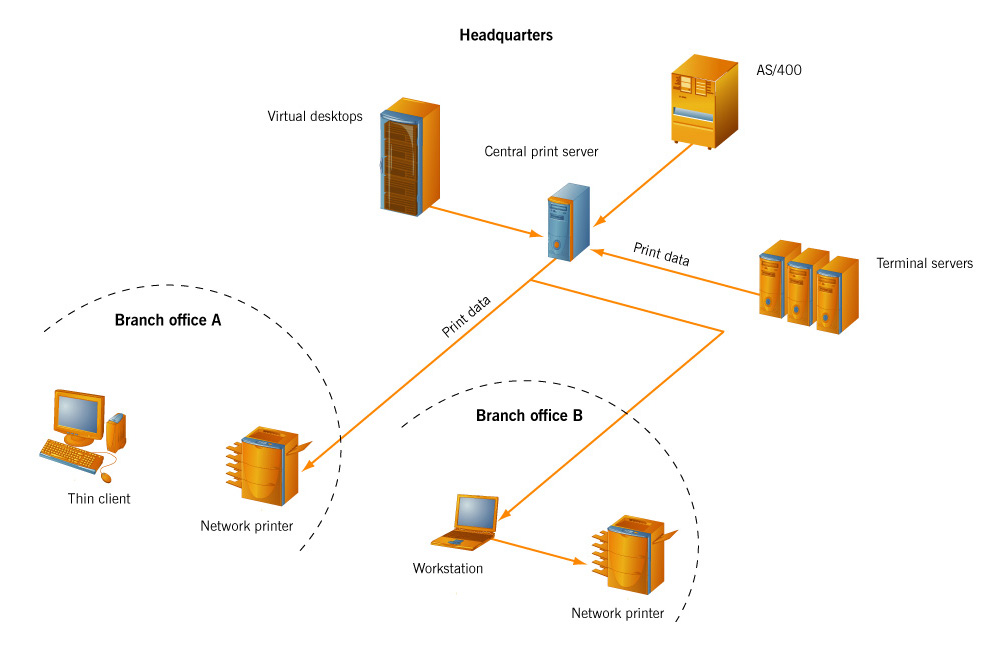
An example of network printing

== See also ==
- Internet Printing Protocol
- CUPS
