= Print job =

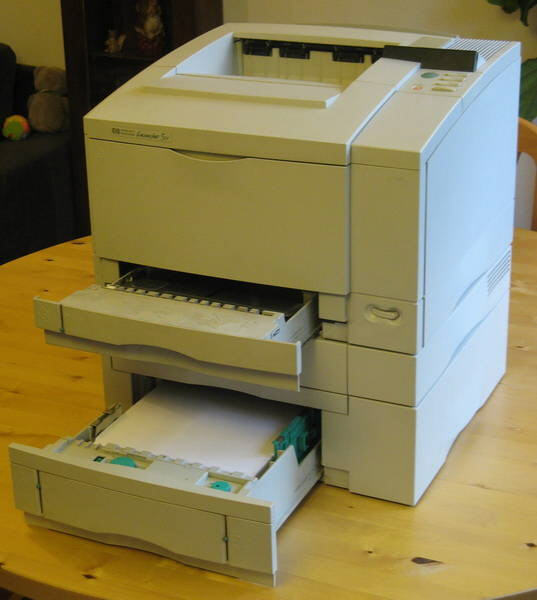
A printer receives print jobs, instructing it on what to print

In computing, a print job is a file or set of files submitted to printer for processing. A printer receives these jobs as instructions on what to output. Each job acts as a single, queueable system object representing a document that must be rendered and transferred to a printer.

Jobs are typically identified by a unique ID and assigned to a specific destination, usually a printer. They include associated options such as media size, number of copies and priority. Print jobs are created on specific print queues and cannot be transferred between them.

== Components ==
A print job consists of several technical elements that manage its configuration and data:

- Job ID: A unique identifier for the job within a specific print queue.
- Spool File: The on-disk representation of the document data.
- Shadow File: The on-disk representation of the job's configuration settings.
- Data Type: Identifies the format of the data in the spool file (like EMF, RAW).
- Configuration: Includes the job name, a set of named properties, etc.

=== Job Status ===
The lifecycle of a print job is generally described in three stages:

1. Spooling: Indicates that the printing application is still processing the data.
2. Printing: Indicates the spool file is currently being read by the print processor.
3. Printed: Indicates the job has been fully written to the destination port.

== Route ==
In larger environments, print jobs may go through a centralized print server before reaching the printing destination. Some multifunction printers have local storage (such as a hard disk drive) to process and queue jobs before printing.

== Security ==
When disposing of old printers with local storage, one should keep in mind that confidential print jobs are potentially still stored unencrypted on the hard disk drive and can be undeleted.

== See also ==
- print (command)
