= EP-101 =

Electronic miniprinter

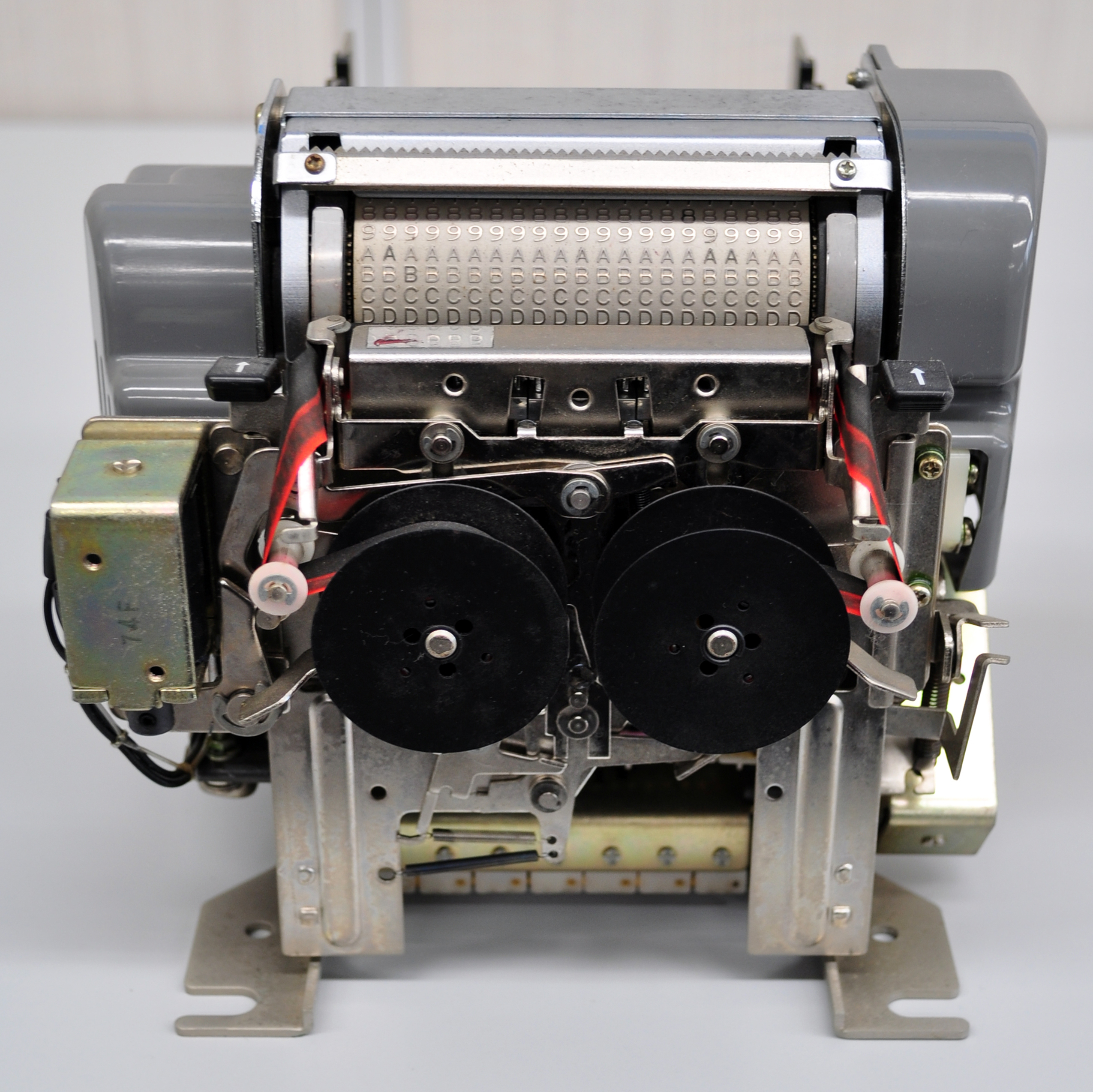
The world's first electronic miniprinter: the EP-101

The EP-101 was the first ever electronic miniprinter for printing figures and symbols and was launched by Shinshu Seiki Co., a subsidiary of Suwa Seikosha Co., Ltd, in September 1968. The drum printer wasn't very big, being only 164 mm (6.5 in) in width, 102 mm (4.0 in) in height, 135 mm (5.3 in) in depth and weighed 2.5 kg (5.5 lb). It was created out of development work that Shinshu Seiki did for the Seiko Group when they became the official time-keepers for the 1964 Tokyo Olympic games and needed a machine that could print out times they gathered from their time-pieces.

In 1975, Shinshu Seiki began branding printers as EPSON. The brand name comes from the next generation version of this printer – son of EP, or EP-son. Shinshu Seiki renamed Epson Corporation in 1982 and was merged with Suwa Seikosha to form Seiko Epson Corporation in 1985.

Certified to Mechanical Engineering Heritage (Japan) No. 131, in 2025.
