= RPCS =

RPCS may stand for:

- Roland Park Country School
- Refined Printing Command Stream
- Reformed Presbyterian Church of Scotland
- Russian Personal Computer Station 3
