= PJL =

PJL may refer to:

- Pakistan Junior League, a defunct Pakistani professional 20-over cricket league
- Printer Job Language, a page description language developed by Hewlett-Packard
- PJL, the Ministry of Railways station code for Palijani railway station, Sindh, Pakistan
