= PPDS =

PPDS may refer to:

- Personal Printer Data Stream, a computer printer language
- Partito Progressista Democratico Sammarinese or Sammarinese Democratic Progressive Party, a political party in San Marino
- Područja od posebne državne skrbi or Areas of Special State Concern, a Croatian government designation for regional development
- Sypaq Corvo Precision Payload Delivery System, a type of unmanned aerial vehicle
