= ZPL =

ZPL may refer to:

- ZPL (complexity), a complexity class
- ZPL (programming language), for scientific applications
- Zebra Programming Language, for label printers
- Zope Public License
- Lachixío Zapotec language (ISO 639-3 language code)
