= Orient Watch =

Japanese watch brand owned by Epson

- Native name: オリエント時計
- Romanized name: Oriento Tokei
- Type: Brand
- Industry: Watchmaking
- Founded: July 13, 1950; 76 years ago Hino, Tokyo, Japan
- Founder: Shogoro Yoshida
- Defunct: February 1, 2026; 9 months ago
- Fate: The original company absorbed into Epson; brand still active
- Headquarters: 29th Floor JR Shinjuku Miraina Tower, 4-1-6 Shinjuku, Shinjuku-ku, Tokyo 160-8801, Japan
- Area served: Worldwide
- Key people: Jiro Miyagawa (president); Masahiro Yoshimura (Director); Takahiro Naito (Director)
- Products: Watches, pocket watches, clocks, moving parts, electronic components
- Net income: ▲¥2.2 million (2021)
- Total assets: ▲¥2.1 billion (2021)
- Number of employees: 747 (530 consolidated and 217 non-consolidated) (2016)
- Parent: Epson
- Website: www.orient-watch.com

Orient and Orient Star are Japanese mechanical watch brands owned and operated by Epson.

Established in 1950 as an independent watchmaker, Orient Watch Co., Ltd. (オリエント時計株式会社, Oriento Tokei Kabushiki-gaisha) primarily manufactured mechanical watches (self-winding and hand-winding), but also produced quartz, light-powered (solar) and radio-controlled models. Wristwatches produced by the company had been marketed under the Orient Watch brand (Orient, Orient Star, Orient Star Royal, Royal Orient). Outside of the main business, in the 1990s, the company diversified its business by manufacturing electronic components for Epson printers. To strengthen production of piezoelectric inkjet printheads for Epson, Orient Watch and Epson deepened their capital alliance, and Orient Watch became a functional subsidiary of Epson in 2009. Its watch business operation was fully integrated into Epson in 2017.

Orient Watch products are primarily manufactured in Japan, with movements produced in-house by Akita Epson Corporation (formerly Akita Orient Precision Instruments Co., Ltd.) in Yuzawa, Akita Prefecture. Some of its low- and mid-range models are manufactured at Epson's subsidiaries in Thailand and China.

Epson is one of the major manufacturers of Seiko timepieces. It develops and manufactures high-end quartz and Spring Drive watches for Seiko (also it produces quartz watch movements for third-party brands), but Orient is an independent brand owned by Epson and is not marketed by Seiko Watch Corporation. The Orient and Orient Star watches are marketed by Epson Japan Corporation.

== History ==
The origin of Orient Watch Company dates back to 1901 when Shogoro Yoshida opened a wholesale shop called "Yoshida Watch Shop" in Ueno, Taito, Tokyo. Yoshida Watch Shop was successful, selling imported pocketwatches. In 1913, Yoshida commenced production of wristwatch cases, and in 1920, established Toyo Tokei Manufacturing Co., Ltd. Initially producing only table clocks and gauges, in 1934 Toyo Tokei Manufacturing started manufacturing wristwatches. In 1936, the Hino factory was built in Hino, Tokyo, Japan. For several years, Toyo Tokei Manufacturing boomed at the Hino factory. However, the company shut down in 1949 in the Japanese economic devastation following World War II.

After Toyo Tokei Manufacturing was shut down, Yoshida's wristwatch manufacturing company was reborn in 1950, founded under the name Tama Keiki Company. Tama Keiki Co. continued manufacturing watches at the Hino factory. In 1951, Tama Keiki Co. changed its name to Orient Watch Company, Limited (オリエント時計株式会社, Oriento Tokei Kabushikigaisha), and in the same year the first Orient Star went on sale. Orient Watch was able to expand their visibility overseas after a memorandum trade agreement with China in 1955. The Royal Orient went on sale in 1960. Other important watches in the company's history include the "Dynamic" in 1956, "Grand Prix 100" in 1964, "Fineness" (the world's thinnest automatic wristwatch with day and date calendar function for its time) in 1967, and the "Tenbeat" in 1970.

In 2003, the Orient Technical Center (OTC) was established and the assembly of luxury watches began in Ugo, Ogachi, Akita, Japan. In 2004, the high-precision caliber 88700 movement went on sale via the Royal Orient watch line. In 2005, Orient Star Retro-Future collection was launched. In 2010, Orient Watch Co. celebrated its 60th anniversary with a limited-edition model. The Royal Orient line was discontinued around 2016, likely to prevent cannibalism between it and fellow Seiko group brands Grand Seiko, and Credor. To celebrate 70 years of the Orient Star line, the Orient Star skeleton watch was introduced with a silicon escapement made using Epson's MEMS technology, which has been used in high end Seiko watches since 2009. In 2026, Orient took a different approach for their Orient Star line, launching the model Sakigake which is stripped down version of the previous models, without power reserve indicator or date complication.

In 2001 Seiko Epson (one of three core companies of the former Seiko Group) became the majority shareholder (52%) of the company. Orient Watch became a wholly owned subsidiary of Epson in 2009. After transferring its business operations to Epson in 2017, Orient Watch Co., Ltd. had remained dormant until it was dissolved in February 2026. Epson Japan Corporation markets the Orient watches, while Akita Epson Corporation manufactures them.

== Gallery ==
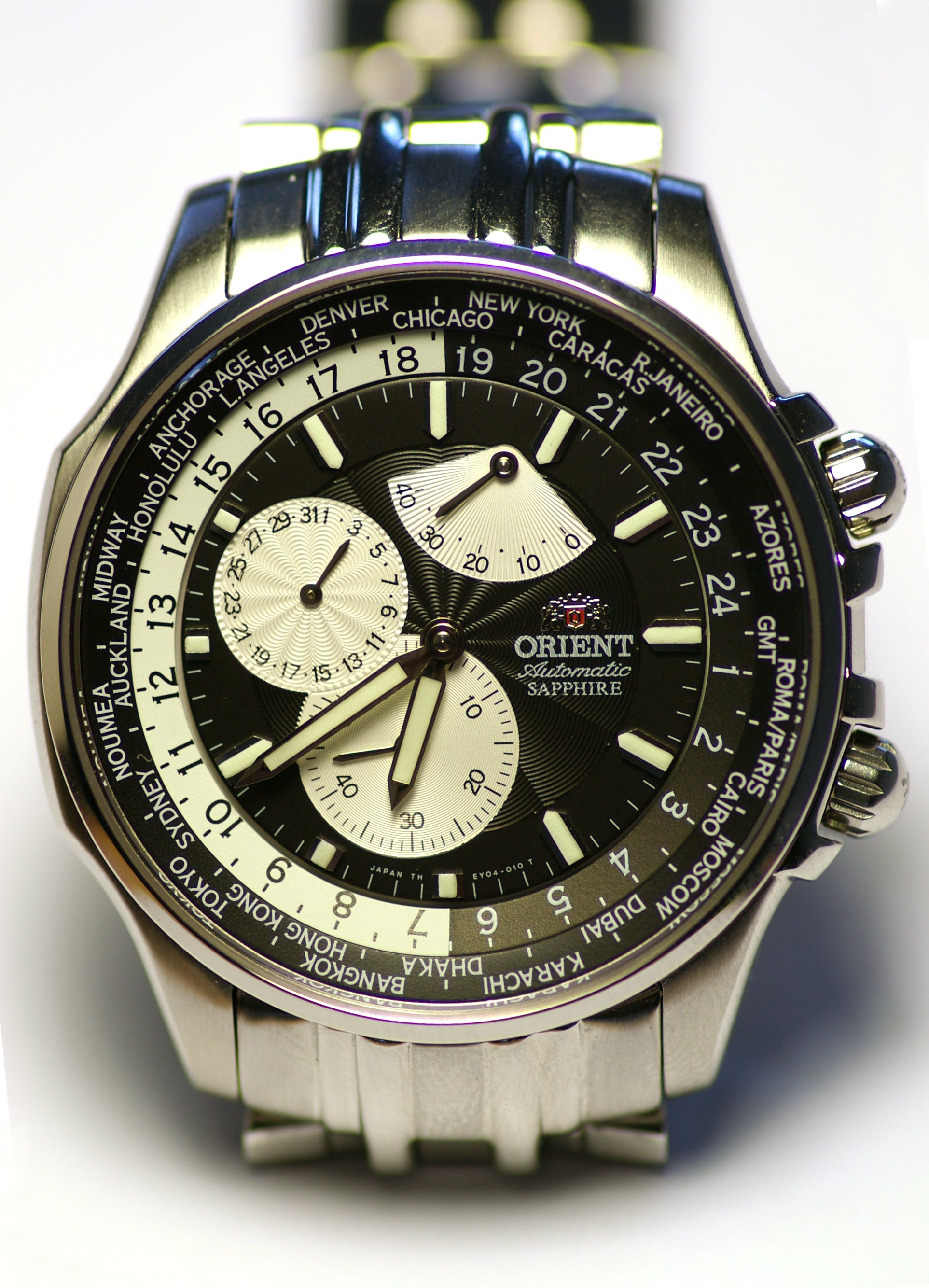
Orient (CEY04002B)

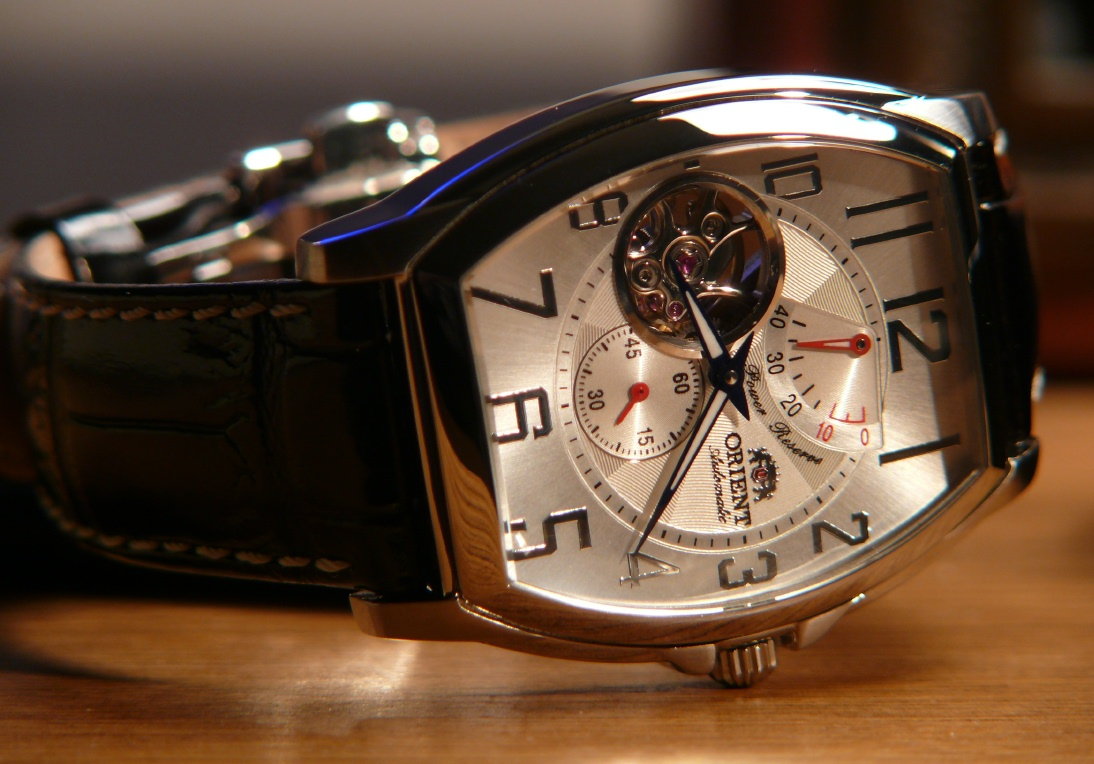
Orient (CFHAA004W)

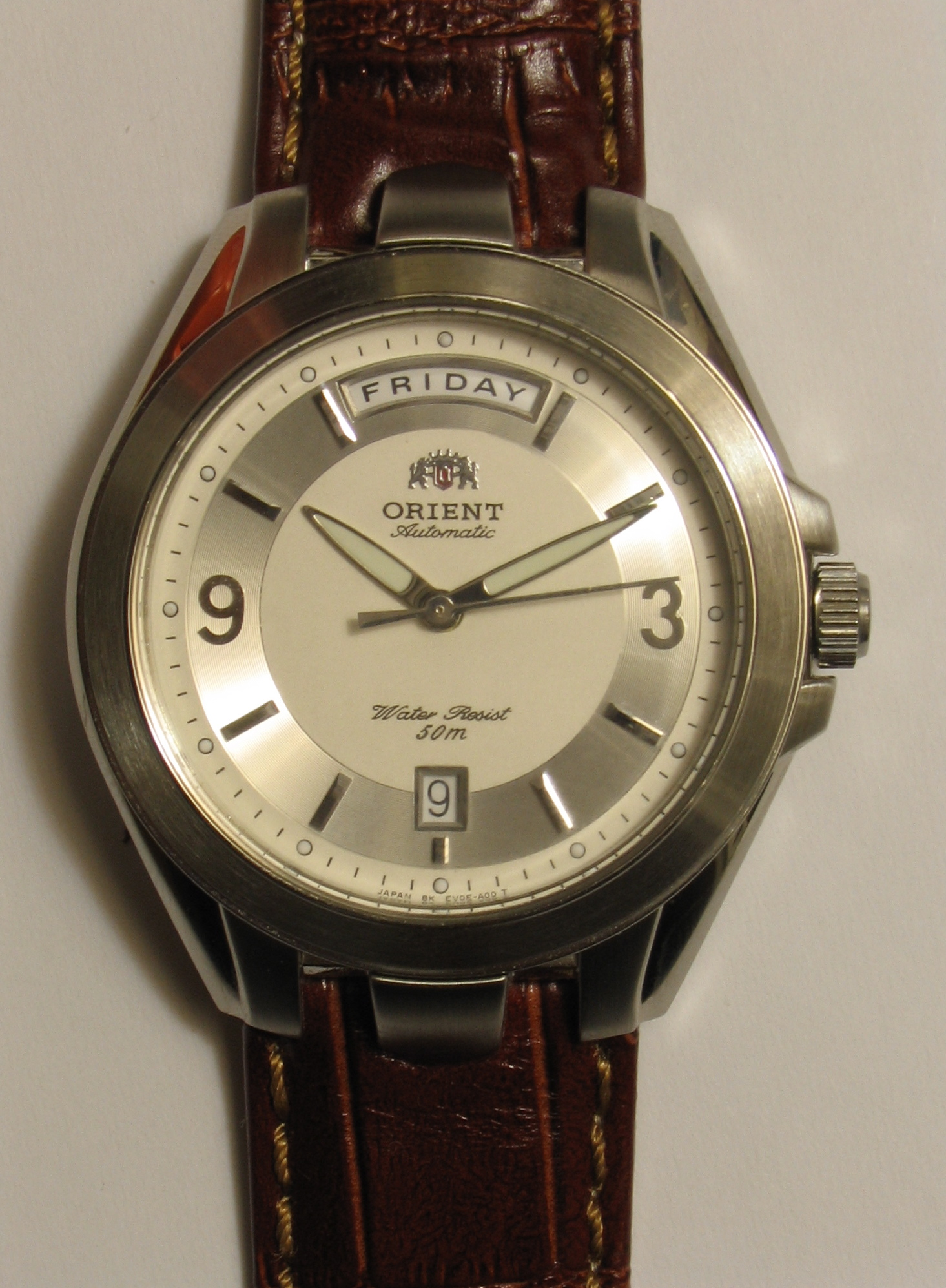
Orient

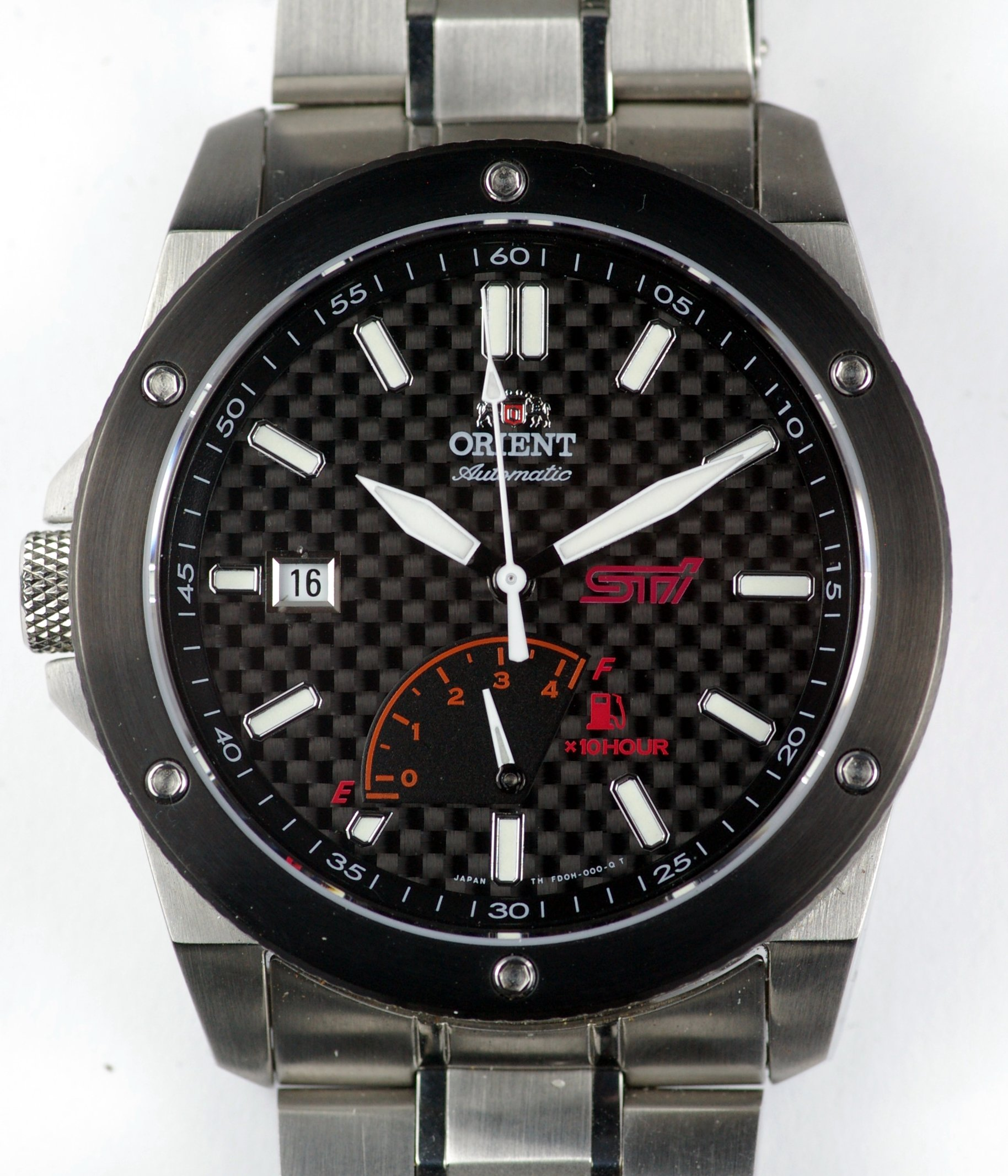
Orient x STI Collaboration 2010 (FD0H001B)

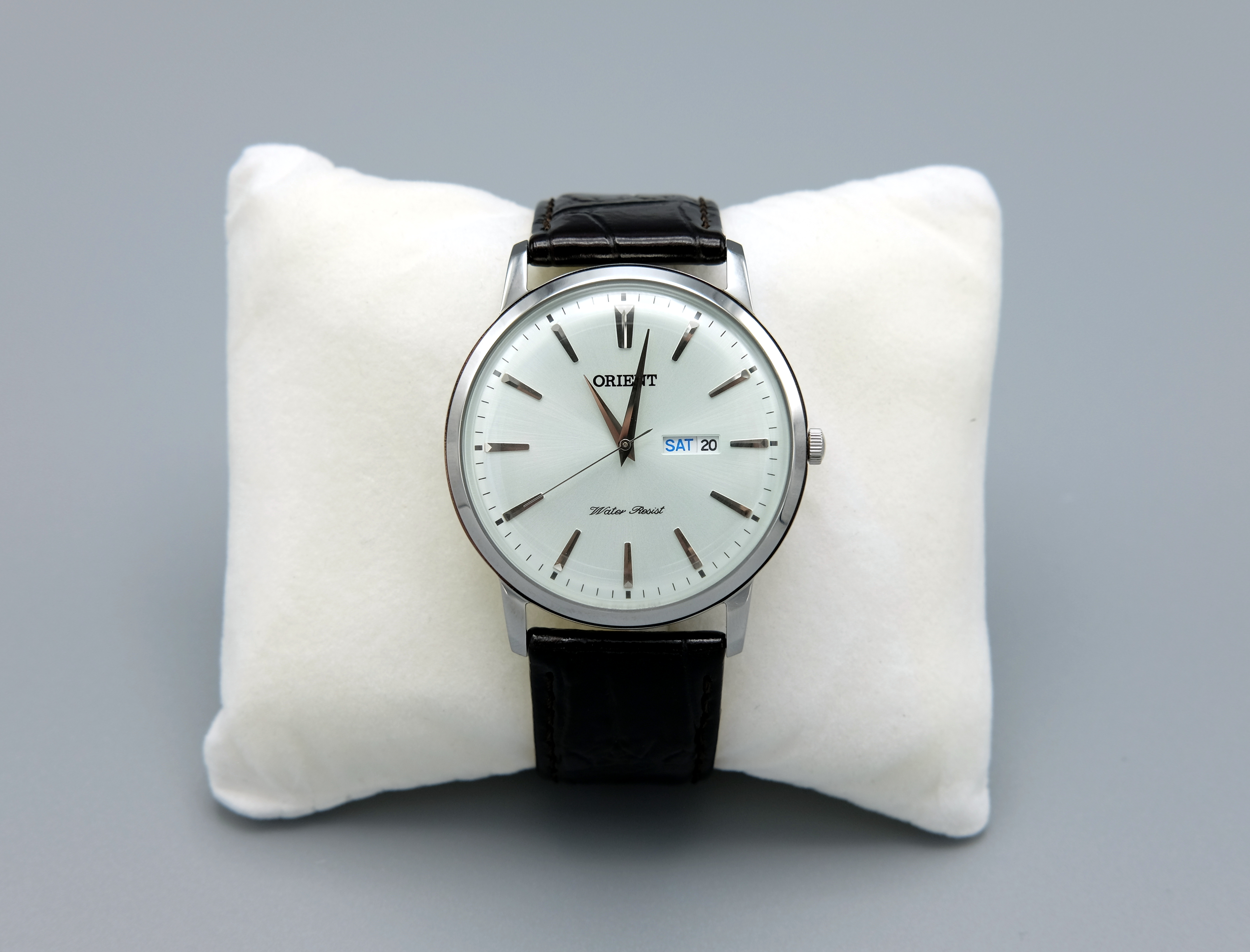
Orient Capital (FUG1R003W9)

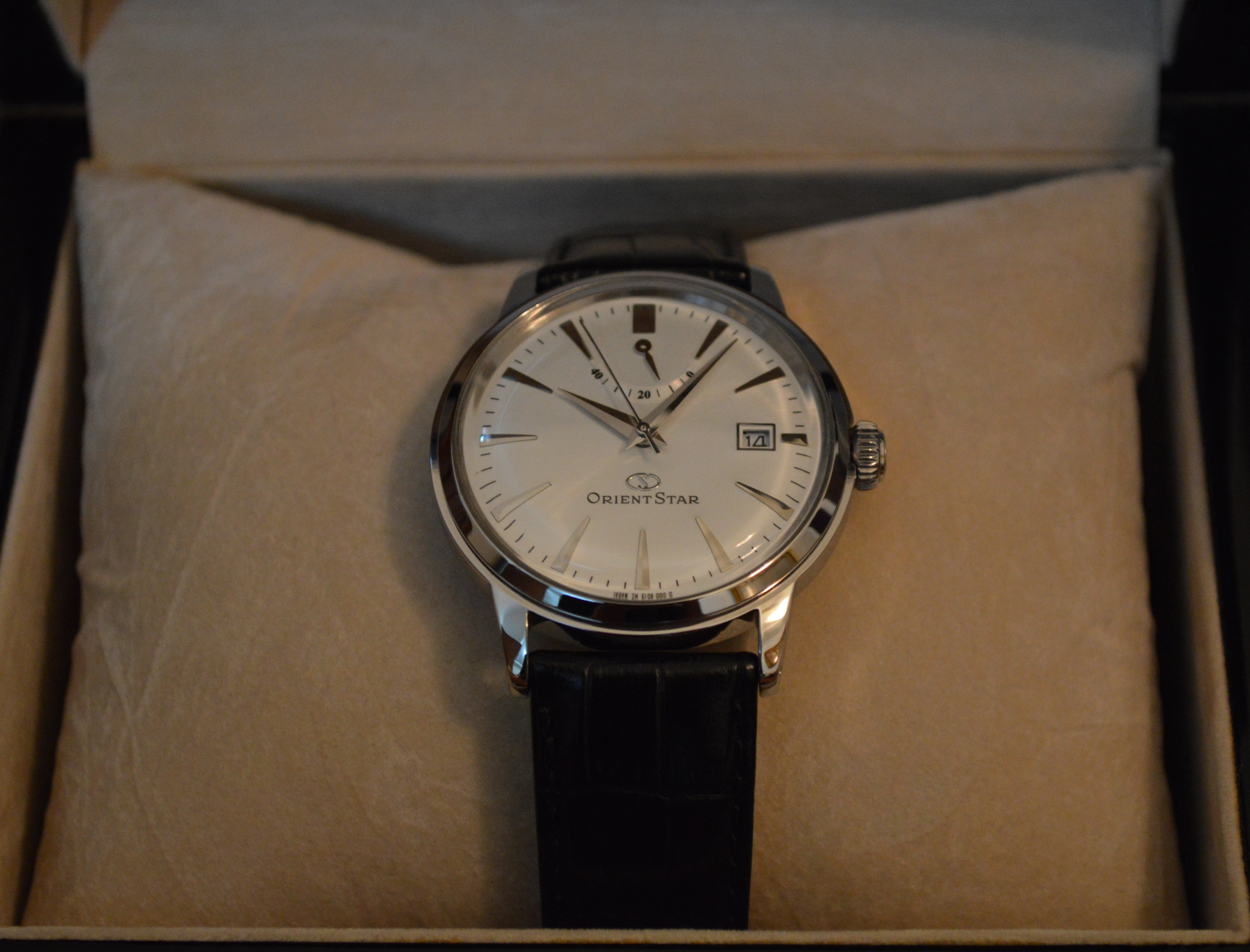
Orient Star - Classic (SEL05004W0)

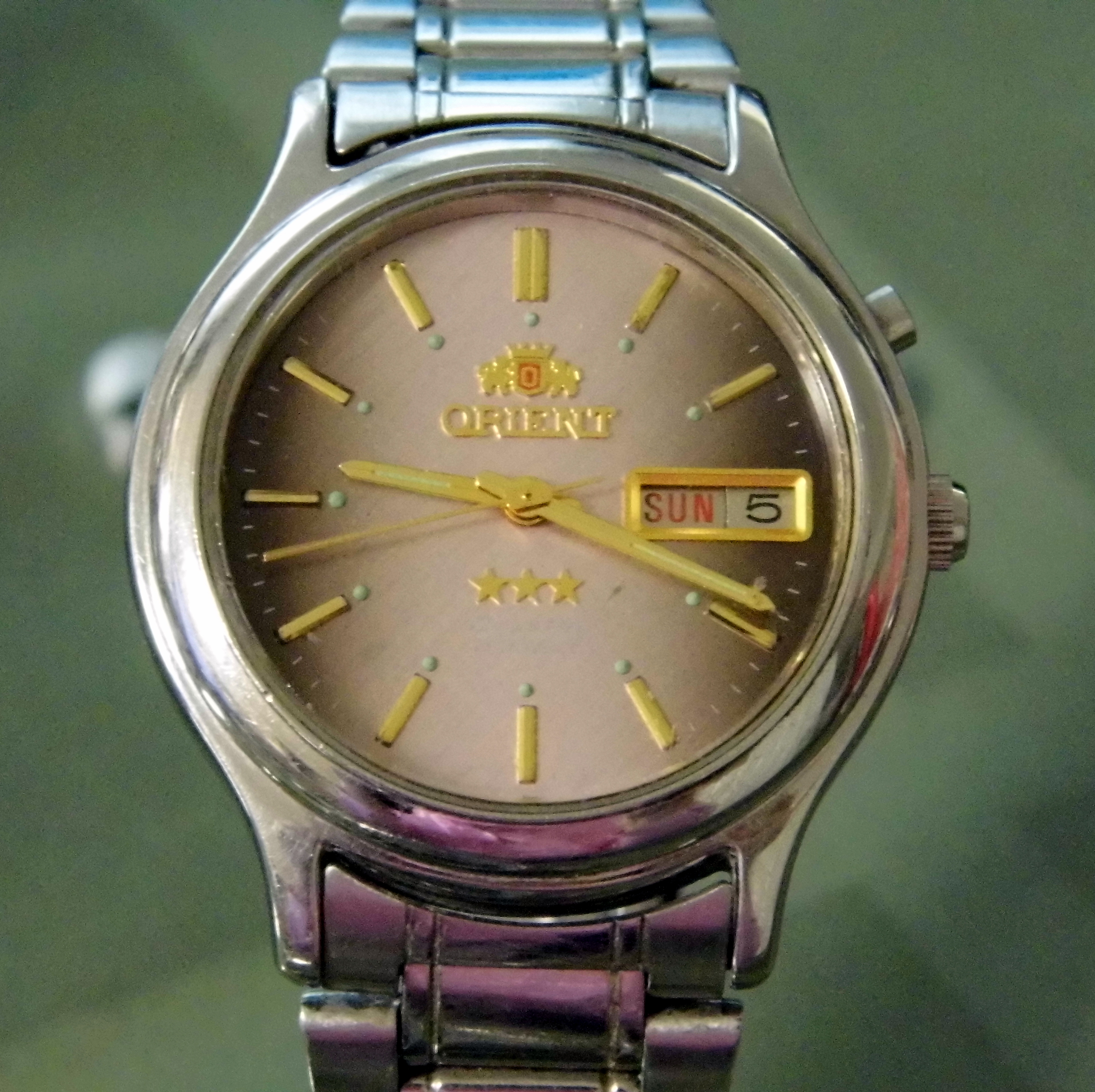
Orient Three Stars
