= Seiko Group =

Japanese corporate group

Seiko, SII and Epson logos. Three companies share "Seiko" in their official names but have different corporate visual identities.

Seiko Group (セイコー・グループ, Seikō Gurūpu) is a corporate group composed of Seiko Group Corporation and its subsidiaries and affiliates. It used to be recognized as a corporate group consisting of three core companies Seiko Holdings Corp. (Seiko; f/k/a K. Hattori & Co., Hattori Seiko), Seiko Instruments Inc. (SII; f/k/a Daini Seikosha, Seiko Instruments & Electronics), and Seiko Epson Corp (Epson; f/k/a Suwa Seikosha). The three companies were linked by a common thread of timepiece technology. Although Epson still develops and manufactures wristwatches for the Seiko Group, Epson and its subsidiaries are not considered part of the group.

== History ==
In June 2003, Seiko Epson became public following their listing on the 1st section of the Tokyo Stock Exchange. Since then, Seiko and the Hattori family have reduced their holdings in Seiko Epson. Although Seiko Group Corporation (f/k/a K. Hattori, Hattori Seiko, and Seiko Holdings) and the key members of the Hattori family still hold approximately 10% of the outstanding shares of Seiko Epson, the company is managed and operated completely independently from Seiko Group. Epson is several times larger than the Seiko Group in terms of revenue and market cap. It has established its own brand image and rarely uses 'Seiko.'

As of October 1, 2009, Seiko Instruments (SII) was merged into Seiko Holdings and became a wholly owned subsidiary of Seiko Holdings.

In 2020, Seiko Instruments transferred its watch business (including its luxury mechanical watch studio, Morioka Seiko Instruments in Shizukuishi, Iwate) to Seiko Watch Corp. and no longer produces SEIKO watches while it supplies watch parts such as quartz crystal resonators and micro batteries to the watch productions.

On October 1, 2022, Seiko Holdings Corporation renamed Seiko Group Corporation. Currently, the original K.Hattori & Co., Ltd. (服部時計店, Hattori Tokeiten) is a holding company called "Seiko Group Corporation" and holds the Seiko companies including Seiko Watch, Seiko Instruments, Seiko Time Creation, Seiko Solutions, Seiko NPC, Seiko Future Creation, Ginza Wako, etc.

Seiko Watch Corp., a subsidiary of Seiko Group Corp., markets SEIKO watches while its subsidiaries Morioka Seiko Instruments, Tono Seiki, Ninohe Tokei Kogyo and foreign subsidiaries manufacture their mechanical and quartz movements. Seiko Watch delegates the manufacture of some of its high-end quartz and spring drive watches (Seiko Astron, Grand Seiko, Credor, etc) to the Wearable Products Operations Division of Epson.

Time Module (TMI), a member of the Seiko Group, was established in 1987 with funding from Seiko Watch Company, Seiko Instruments Inc., and Seiko Epson Corp. to manufacture watch movements. Currently, TMI is wholly owned by Seiko Group Corp.

== Companies ==
- Seiko Group Corporation (Seiko), headquartered in Ginza, Tokyo
  - Seiko Watch Corporation
    - Morioka Seiko Instruments Inc. (development and manufacturing of watches)
    - Seiko Time Labs Co., Ltd. (repairs, and maintenance service for watches)
    - Cronos Inc. (watch retailer)
  - Seiko Solutions Inc. (system solution)
  - Seiko Time Creation Inc. (clocks, sports timing, display boards)
  - Wako Co., Ltd. (upscale specialty retailer)
  - Seiko NPC Corporation (semiconductors)
  - Seiko Future Creation Inc. (research and development, factory automation systems, analysis and microprocessing services)
  - Seiko Optical Products Co., Ltd. (eyeglasses - lenses & frames; Seiko Group owns 50%)
  - Ohara Corporation (specialty optical glass; Seiko Group owns 41.1% TYO: 5218)
  - etc.
- Seiko Instruments Inc. (SII), a subsidiary of Seiko Group Corporation, headquartered in Chiba
  - SII NanoTechnology Inc.
  - Morioka Seiko Instruments Inc.
  - SII Network Systems Inc.
  - SII Mobile Communications Inc.
  - SII Data Service Corp.
  - SII Printek Inc.
  - SII Microtechno Inc.
  - SII Micro Parts Ltd.
  - SII Micro Precision Inc.
  - Epolead Services Inc.
  - Seiko I Infotech Inc.
  - Seiko I Techno Research Co., Ltd.
  - Seiko EG&G Co., Ltd.
  - City Service Co., Ltd.
  - SII Crystal Technologies, Ltd.
  - etc.
- Seiko Epson Corporation (Epson), headquartered in Suwa, Nagano
  - Epson Sales, Japan Corporation
  - Miyazaki Epson Corporation
  - Epson Direct Corporation
  - Epson Service Corporation
  - Epson Atmix Corporation
  - Epson Software Development Laboratory Inc.
  - Yasu Semiconductor Corporation
  - Seiko Epson Contact Lens Corporation
  - Seiko Lens Service Center Corporation
  - Epson Imaging Devices Corporation
  - Orient Watch
  - Trume Watch
  - etc.

== See also ==
- Seikosha
- Astron (wristwatch)
