= Xerox 2700 =

1982 monochrome laser printer

Xerox 2700 Distributed Electronic Printer
- Introduced: March 11, 1982; 43 years ago
- Cost: $18,995
- Type: Laser printer
- Processor: Intel 8086/Zilog Z-80
- Memory: 64–256 KB RAM
- Read-only memory: 32 KB built-in ROM;4x32 KB plug-in cartridges
- Connection: Parallel/serial
- Power consumption: 120/240V; 350W standby; 1150W printing
- Dots per inch: 300x300
- Speed: 12ppm
- Weight: 295 pounds (134 kg)
- Dimensions: 26 by 26 by 36 inches (66 cm × 66 cm × 91 cm) (WxDxH)

The Xerox 2700 is a discontinued monochrome laser printer from Xerox Corporation. The 2700 was announced in March, 1982, and can print up to 12 pages per minute (PPM), one-sided, on standard A4 or Letter cut-sheet paper. It occupies 5 square feet (0.46 m^{2}) of floor space, and cost $18,995 (equivalent to $61,891 in 2024). The 2700 is rated for a print volume of 15,000 pages per month, although some users got up to 100,000 pages.

== History ==
The first successful products based on the xerographic process were for office copying applications with direct optical imaging, but by about 1961 there were experiments under way at Xerox to explore other applications and imaging methods. In 1964, Xerox introduced LDX (Long Distance Xerography) a facsimile system which used a CRT (cathode ray tube) as an imaging source. A version for computer printing was offered as the XGP (Xerox Graphics Printer).

In 1973, The Xerox 1200, used an optical analogue of the drum line printer—a spinning optical character drum and a row of xenon tubes whose flashing was timed to project the required characters onto the xerographic photosensor. It was ingenious and unique. In 1977, Xerox introduced laser imaging for computer printing with the 9700 which was based on the 9200 copier and digital imaging technology from PARC.

Although the Xerox 8010 Star, introduced in 1981, was not a commercial success, one of the technologies it developed was the XP-12 marking engine for the Xerox 8044 printer, which became the basis for the 2700.

The 2700 was rebadged by Digital Equipment Corporation, who marketed it as the LN01.

== Data stream ==
Conventional character printer protocols of the time used control characters and escape codes (the ESC character followed by another character) for formatting. Laser printing extensions required additional escape codes for functions like font changes and imbedded images. Xerox developed a page description language known as Xerox Escape Sequence (XES).

== Specifications ==
The 2700 prints 12 pages per minute at 300x300 dots per inch(DPI). It has two 250-sheet input paper cassettes, and a 500 sheet offsetting stacker to offset sections of output between print jobs or copy groups.

It uses an Intel 8086 CPU and an Intel 8089 coprocessor for input/output. It comes with 64 KB or 256 KB of RAM and 32 KB of ROM, with up to 4 32 KB in plug-in cartridges. The on-board ROM holds two font sets, portrait and landscape. The optional plug-in cartridges hold fonts and logos, and additional bitmaps can be downloaded.

The 2700 offers a variety of interface options. it provides serial Binary Synchronous (Bisync)—IBM 2770/2780/3780 emulation or asynchronous communications. It also supports parallel Centronics or Dataproducts emulation.

== See also ==
- Laser printing
