= RTL =

RTL may refer to:

== Media ==
- RTL Group, a European TV, radio, and production company
    - List of RTL Group's television stations (including part-owned channels)
    - List of RTL Group's radio stations
  - RTL Lëtzebuerg, usually referred to simply as RTL
  - RTL (German TV channel)
  - RTL (Hungarian TV channel), formerly known as RTL Klub
  - RTL (French radio)
- RTL 102.5, Italian radio station unaffiliated with RTL Group
  - RTL 102.5 TV, Italian music television channel, broadcasting live video feed of radio station RTL 102.5
- RTL9, Luxembourg television channel formerly owned by RTL Group
- RTL (Croatian TV channel), Croatian television channel formerly owned by RTL Group
- RTL Nederland (formerly owned by RTL Group)

== Computing and electronics ==
- Prefix in model/part numbers of some Realtek integrated circuits
- Register-transfer level or register-transfer logic, of a digital logic circuit
- Register transfer language, a type of computer language
- Hewlett-Packard Raster Transfer Language, a command language for communicating with Hewlett-Packard plotter output devices
- Resistor–transistor logic, a class of digital circuits
- Runtime library, in programming languages and computer software
- Run-time linking, in computing, when a dynamic linker links a software executable to software libraries at the time the executable is run

== Others ==
- Ready to Learn, a zero-tolerance behavior system used in some British secondary schools
- RTL Turboliner, a gas turbine trainset
- Ride the Lightning, a 1984 album by the American heavy metal band Metallica
- Right-to-left, writing direction of a script
- Right to life, a belief that humans have a right not to be killed
- Re-education through labor in the prison system of China
- Réseau de transport de Longueuil, a public transit system in Longueuil, Quebec, Canada
- V/Line RTL, Road Transferable Locomotive, a class of road and rail locomotive
- Raajje Transport Link, a transport project based in the Maldives.
