= Xerox Escape Sequence =

Printer page description language

Xerox Escape Sequence or XES is a page description language (PDL) developed by Xerox corporation and introduced with their 2700 laser printers in 1982. XES offers similar capabilities to Hewlett-Packard's Printer Command Language (PCL), which first appeared in 1984. XES is supported by most Xerox laser printers including the 2700, 3700, 4011, 4030, 4045, 4197, 4213, 4235, and 4700.

XES is sometimes known as UDK, from User Defined Key, the character which introduces the printer command. Commands are normally introduced by the escape character (ESC, ASCII 0x1B, EBCDIC 0x27). This character may be changed in the data stream by the command =UDK=c, where c is the value to be used going forward. c may be any character except U, D, K, space, or 0 through 9.

XES commands perform the following functions
Fonts	Loading and unloading fonts. Change font for subsequent text (only raster fonts are supported).
Text placement	Position text on page using absolute or relative coordinates. Justifying and centring text. Printing subscript, superscript, bold, underscored, or overstruck text. Specifying line spacing. Setting tabulation (both horizontal and vertical).
Line drawing	Drawing lines between two positions on the page.
Page formatting	Specifying page margins. Setting and clearing tabulation.
Page merge	Storing or unloading a page of data available to merge with subsequent pages.
Graphics	A graphic window is a rectangular area on a page in which a raster graphic image may be printed. The image is transmitted, in sixel encoding, following with the command, and may be magnified 1, 2, or 4 times. A graphic window may be created and stored, and called out for printing as required, for example to print a logo on each page.
Miscellaneous	Printing current page. Specifying language or use custom character mapping table. Resetting printer state. Data monitor mode (printing datastream in hexadecimal). Setting or clearing positions for simulated carriage control tape.
