= Intellifont =

Scalable font technology

Intellifont is a scalable font technology developed by Tom Hawkins at Compugraphic in Wilmington, Massachusetts during the late 1980s, the patent for which was granted to Hawkins in 1987. Intellifont fonts were hinted on a Digital Equipment Corporation VAX mainframe computer using Ikarus software. In 1990, printer and computing system manufacturer Hewlett-Packard adopted Intellifont scaling as part of its PCL 5 printer control protocol, and Intellifont technology was shipped with HP LaserJet III and 4 printers. In 1991, Commodore released AmigaOS 2.04, which included a version of diskfont.library that contained the Bullet font scaling engine (which in Workbench 2.1 became a separate library called bullet.library), with native support for the format. Intellifont technology became part of Agfa-Gevaert's Universal Font Scaling Technology (UFST), which allows OEMs to produce printers capable of printing on either the Adobe systems PostScript or HP PCL language.

== See also ==
- PCL
