= Astron (wristwatch) =

First quartz wristwatch in the world; made by Seiko in 1969

Seiko Quartz-Astron 35SQ
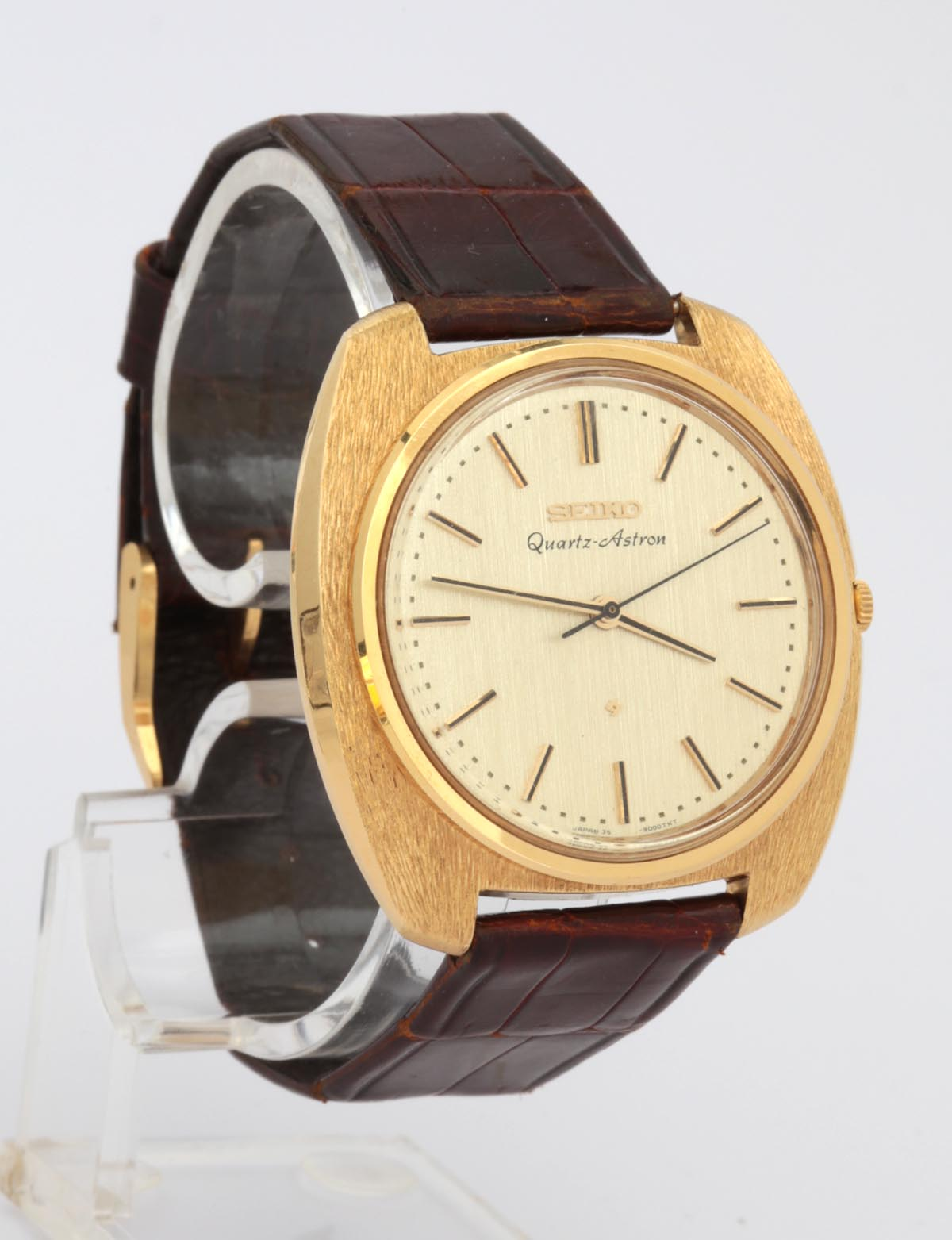
- Type: Quartz
- Display: Analogue
- Introduced: December 25, 1969

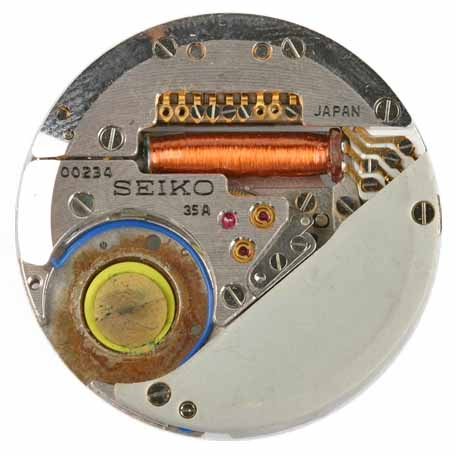
Quartz movement of the Seiko Astron, 1969

The Astron wristwatch, formally known as the Seiko Quartz-Astron 35SQ, was the world's first "quartz clock" wristwatch. It is now registered on the List of IEEE Milestones as a key advance in electrical engineering.

== History ==
The Astron was unveiled in Tokyo on December 25, 1969, after ten years of research and development at Suwa Seikosha (currently named Seiko Epson), a manufacturing company of Seiko Group. Within one week 100 gold watches had been sold, at a retail price of 450,000 yen (US$1,250 (equivalent to $10,974 in 2025)) each (at the time, equivalent to the price of a medium-sized car). Essential elements included a XY-type quartz oscillator of 8192 Hz (8192 = 2^{13}), a hybrid integrated circuit, and a phase locked ultra-small stepping motor to turn its hands. According to Seiko, Astron was accurate to ±5 seconds per month or one minute per year, and its battery life was 1 year or longer.

== Anniversaries ==
In March 2010, at the Baselworld watch fair and trade show in Switzerland, Seiko previewed a limited edition new version of the watch and related designs of the original Astron watch, commemorating the fortieth anniversary in December 2009 of the debut of the Astron watch.

== Second generation ==
Seiko used the "Astron" trademark again as "Seiko Astron" when it released a satellite radio-wave solar-powered wristwatch using GPS satellites in 2012.

=== 50th anniversary model ===
In 2019, Seiko released several limited edition Astron models to commemorate the 50th anniversary of the quartz Astron. Among them, the model produced in a limited edition of 50 pieces (3.8 million yen) mimics the original case design and has a rough engraving pattern by craftsmen belonging to Epson's "Micro Artist Workshop".
