= CaPSL =

Programming language

CaPSL is a printer command language/page description language used by early Canon printers including the LBP-8III series and supported on (at least) LBP-8IV printers.

CaPSL was discontinued, with later Canon printers implementing PCL. It was also called LIPS or LIPS4. A Windows Spool File could contain RAW CaPSL data.
