= Epson =

Japanese multinational electronics company

Seiko Epson Corporation

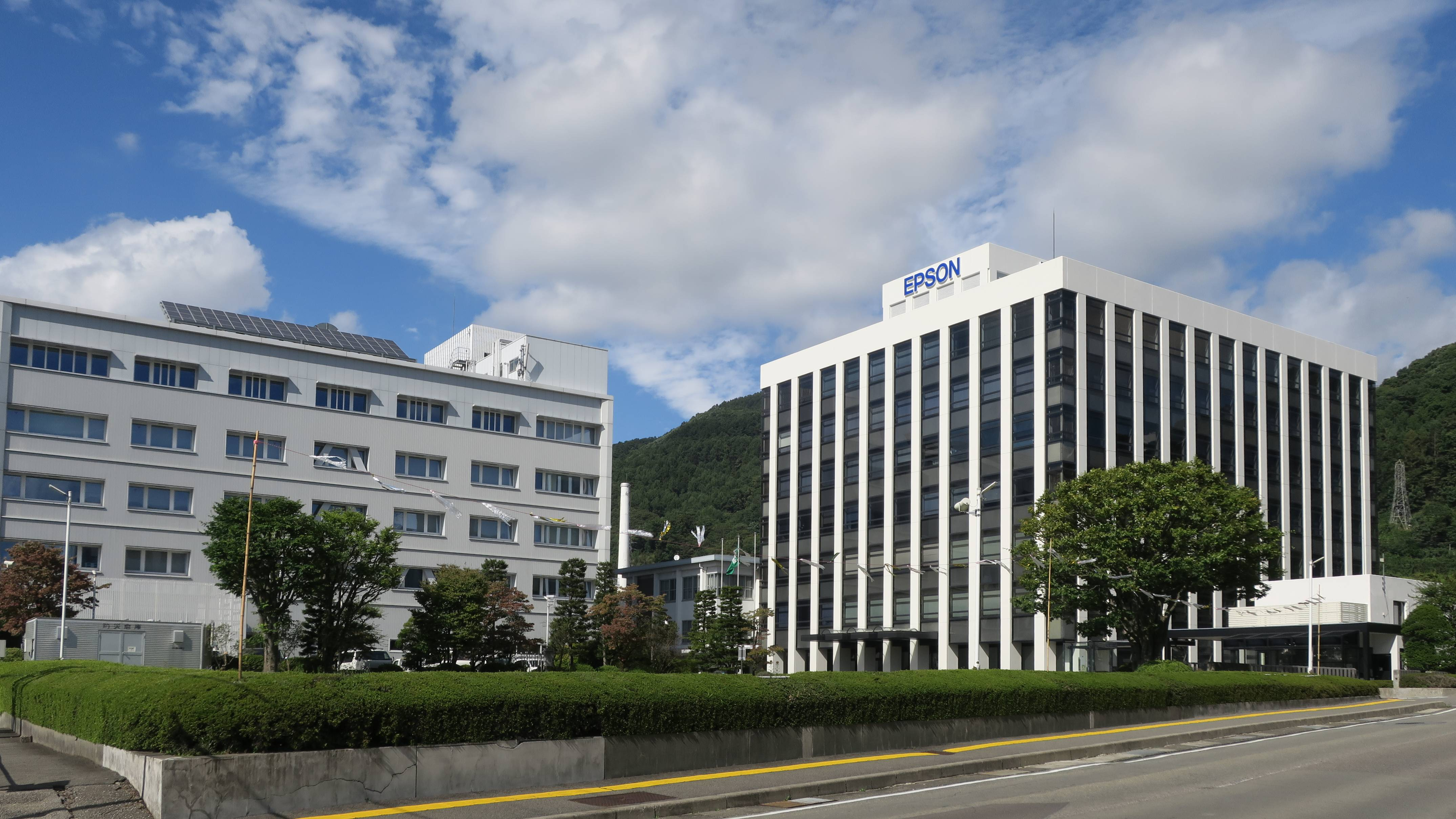
- Epson's corporate headquarters in Suwa, Nagano
- Trade name: Epson
- Native name: セイコーエプソン株式会社
- Romanized name: Seikō Epuson Kabushiki-gaisha
- Type: Public
- Traded as: TYO: 6724
- Industry: Electronics
- Founded: May 18, 1942; 84 years ago (as Daiwa Kogyo, Ltd.)
- Founder: Hisao Yamazaki
- Headquarters: Owa, Suwa, Nagano City, Nagano Prefecture, Japan (Officially registered in Shinjuku, Tokyo)
- Area served: Worldwide
- Key people: Minoru Usui (chairman & Director); Yasunori Ogawa (president, CEO & Representative Director)
- Products: Printers; personal computers; robots; projectors; watches; smartglasses; semiconductors
- Revenue: ▲¥1,362.9 billion (FY2024)
- Net income: ¥ 52 billion (2024) (FY2024)
- Number of employees: 74,619 (as 2026)
- Divisions: Orient Watch
- Website: corporate.epson

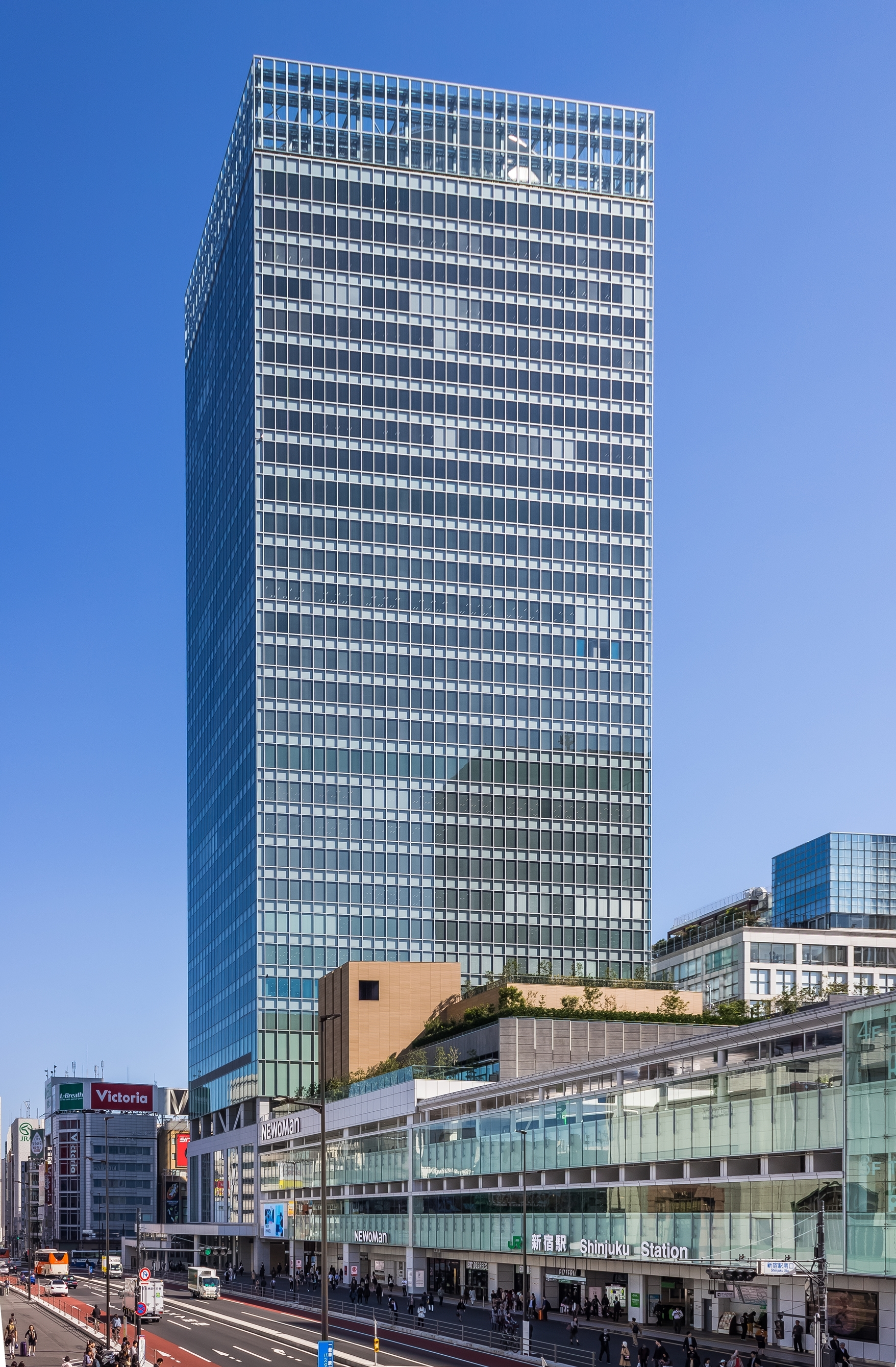
JR Shinjuku Miraina Tower, which houses the Tokyo office (registered office) of Seiko Epson and the headquarters of Epson Japan on the 29th-32nd levels, located adjunct to the JR East Shinjuku Station in Shinjuku and Shibuya wards, Tokyo

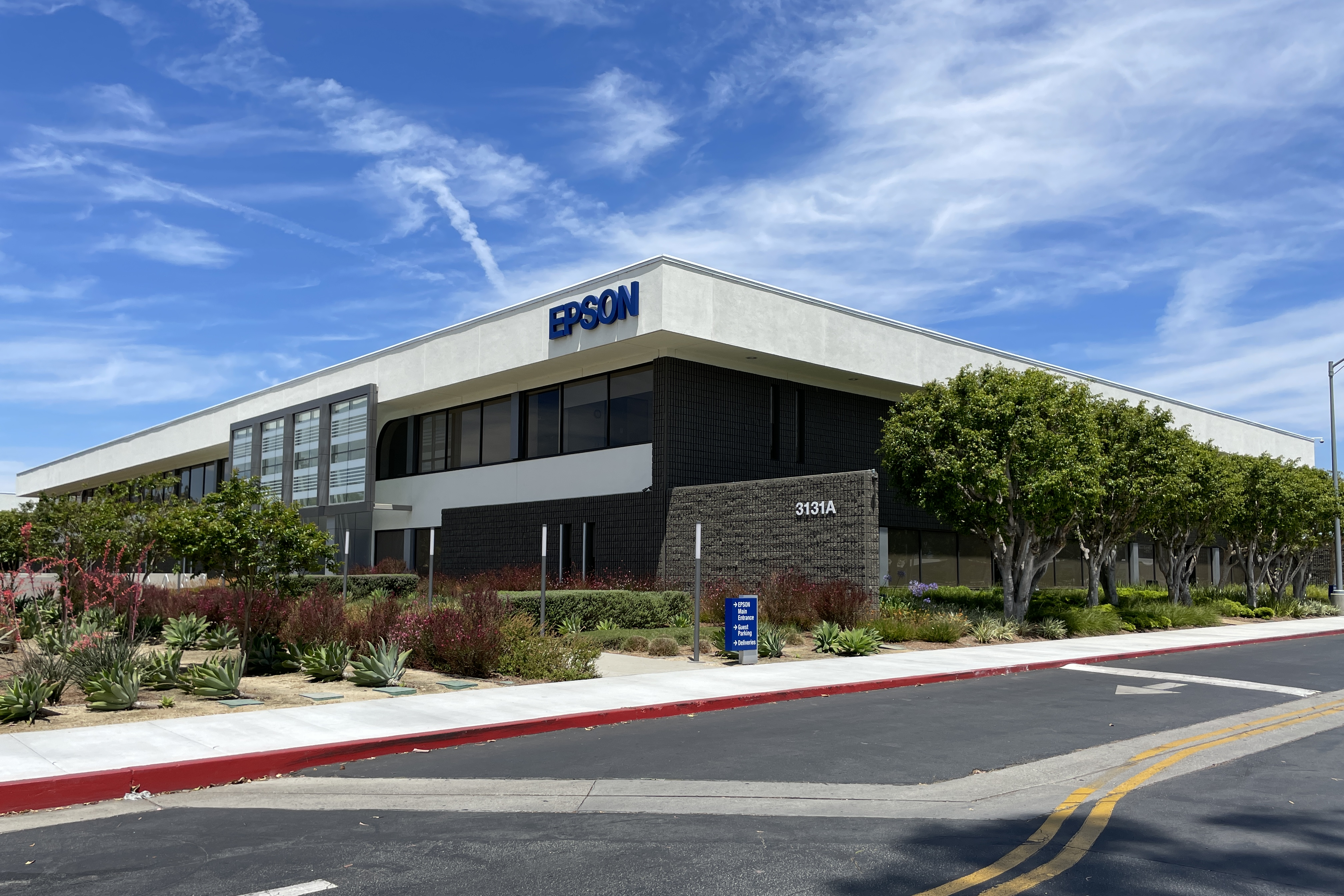
Epson America headquarters in Los Alamitos, California

Seiko Epson Corporation, commonly known as Epson, is a Japanese multinational corporation headquartered in Suwa, Nagano, Japan, and one of the world's largest manufacturers of printers and information- and imaging-related equipment. Its products include inkjet, dot matrix, thermal and laser printers for consumer, business and industrial use, scanners, laptop and desktop computers, video projectors, watches, smartglasses, industrial robots and automation equipment, amorphous alloy powders, MIM parts, semiconductors, crystal oscillators, sensing devices and other associated electronic components.

The company has developed as one of the manufacturing companies (formerly known as Seikosha) of the Seiko Group, a name traditionally known for manufacturing Seiko timepieces. Seiko Epson develops and manufactures certain models of quartz and Spring Drive wristwatches for the Seiko Watch, but is neither a subsidiary nor an affiliate of Seiko Group Corporation.

== History ==
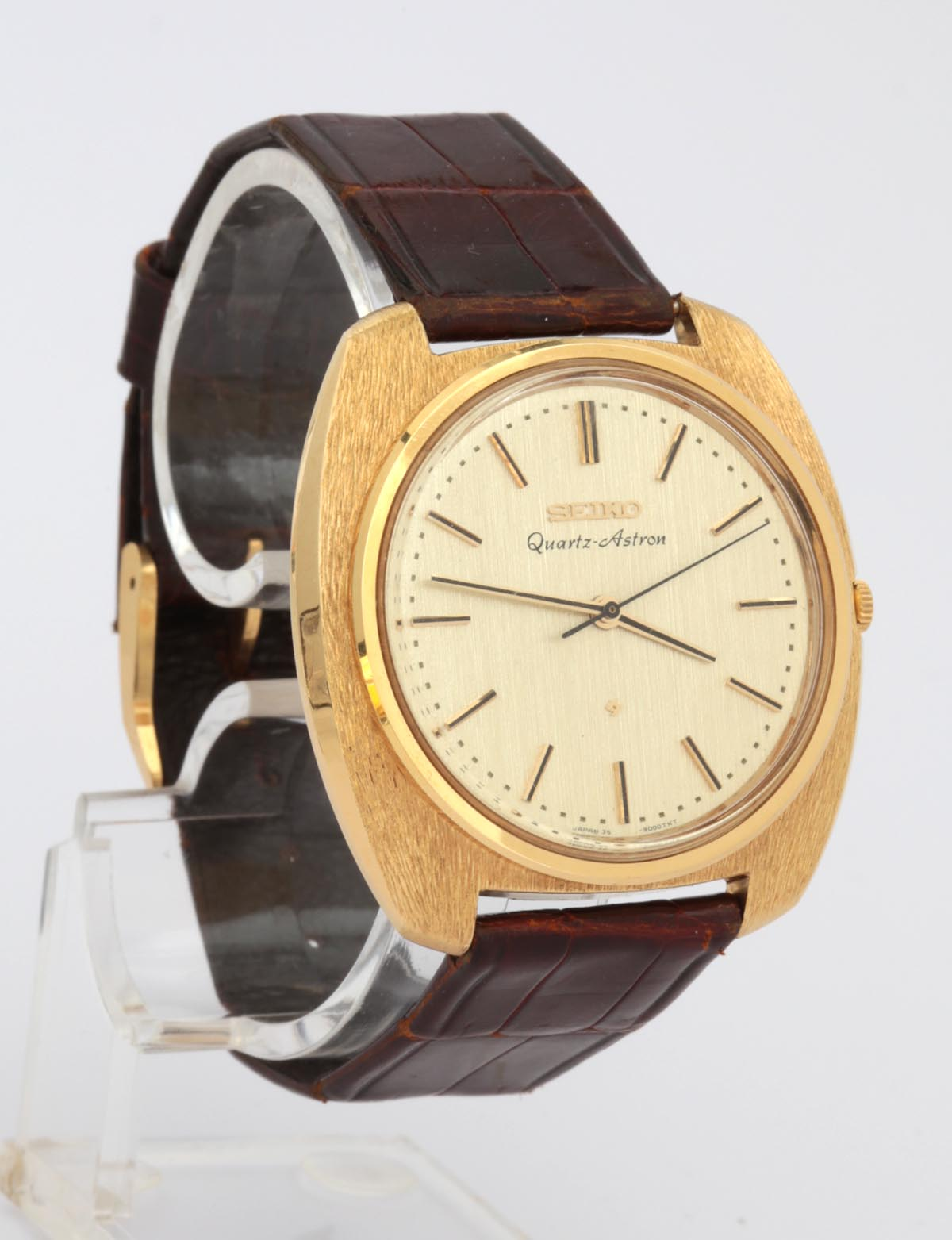
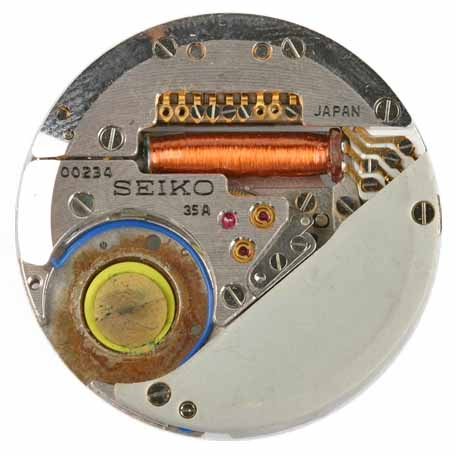
First quartz wristwatch movement, the Caliber 35A developed by Suwa Seikosha in 1969 and used in the Seiko Astron

=== Origins ===
The roots of Seiko Epson Corporation go back to a company called Daiwa Kogyo, Ltd. which was founded in May 1942 by Hisao Yamazaki, a local clock shop owner and former employee of K. Hattori & Co., in Suwa, Nagano. Daiwa Kogyo was supported by an investment from the Hattori family (founder of the Seiko Group) and began as a manufacturer of watch parts for Daini Seikosha (currently Seiko Instruments). The company started operation in a 230-square-metre (2,500 sq ft) renovated miso storehouse with 22 employees.

In 1943, Daini Seikosha established a factory in Suwa for manufacturing Seiko watches with Daiwa Kogyo. In 1959, the Suwa Factory was split up and merged into Daiwa Kogyo to form Suwa Seikosha Co., Ltd: the forerunner of the Seiko Epson Corporation. The company has developed many timepiece technologies, such as the "Magic Lever" bi-directional winding system in 1959, the world's first portable quartz timer (Seiko QC-951) in 1963, the world's first commercial quartz watch (Seiko Quartz Astron 35SQ) in 1969, the first six-digit LCD digital watch with running seconds in 1973, the first automatic power-generating quartz watch (Seiko Auto-Quartz) in 1988, the Spring Drive watch movement in 1999, and the first solar-powered GPS wristwatch in 2012.

The watch business is the root of the company's ultra-precision machining and micromechatronics technologies and still a major business for Seiko Epson, although it accounts for a low percentage of total revenues. Watches made by the company are sold through the Seiko Watch Corporation, a subsidiary of Seiko Group. The watch brand Orient Watch, and its sub-brand Orient Star, has been owned by Epson since 2009 and was fully integrated into the company in 2017.

=== Printers ===
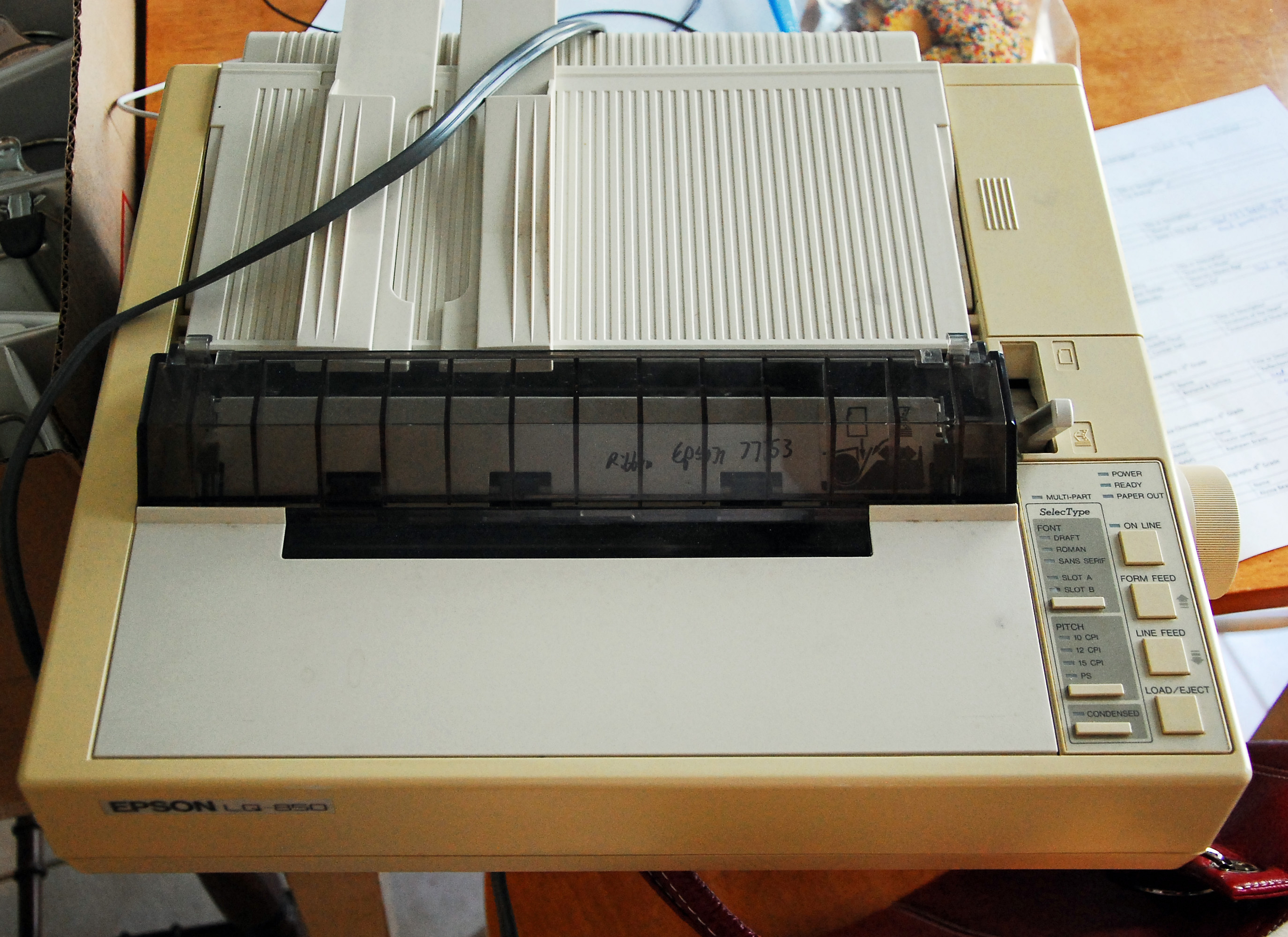
Epson LQ 850 dot matrix printer

In 1961, Suwa Seikosha established a company called Shinshu Seiki Co. as a subsidiary to supply precision parts for Seiko watches. When Seiko was selected to be the official time keeper for the 1964 Summer Olympics in Tokyo, a printing timer was required to time events, and Shinshu Seiki started developing an electronic printer.

In September 1968, Shinshu Seiki launched the world's first mini-printer, the EP-101 ("EP" for Electronic Printer), which was soon incorporated into many calculators. In June 1975, the name Epson was coined for the next generation of printers based on the EP-101, which was released to the public. The Epson name was coined by joining the initials EP (Electronic Printer) and the word son, making "Epson" mean "Electronic Printer's Son". In April of the same year, Epson America Inc. was established to sell printers for Shinshu Seiki Co.

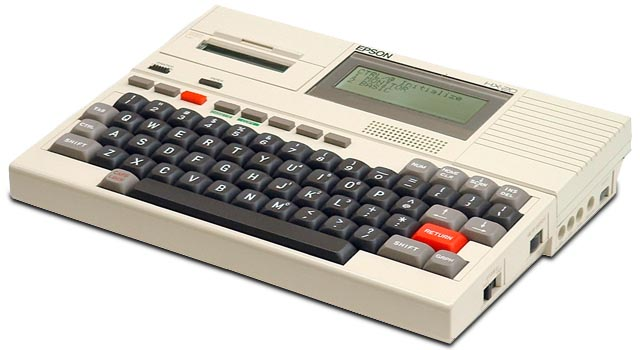
Epson HX-20

In June 1978, the TX-80 (TP-80), an eighty-column dot matrix printer, was released to the market and was mainly used as a system printer for the Commodore PET computer. After two years of further development, an improved model, the MX-80 (MP-80), was launched in October 1980. It was soon advertised as the best selling printer in the United States. By 1982 Epson reportedly had 75% of the printer market; its products were so beloved that Steve Wozniak joked, "I doubt we'll ever bomb Japan as long as they make Epson printers".

In July 1982, Shinshu Seiki officially named itself the Epson Corporation. In May 1983, it released the world's first portable colour LCD TV.

In November 1985, Suwa Seikosha Co., Ltd. and the Epson Corporation merged to form Seiko Epson Corporation.

The company developed the Micro Piezo inkjet technology, which used a piezoelectric crystal in each nozzle and did not heat the ink at the print head while spraying it onto the page, and released the Epson MJ-500 inkjet cartridge for the Epson Stylus 800 printer in March 1993. Shortly after in 1994, Epson released the first 720 dpi colour inkjet printer, the Epson Stylus Color (P860A) utilizing the Micro Piezo head technology. Newer models of the Stylus series employed Epson's special DURABrite ink and used two hard drives (an HD 850 and an HD 860).

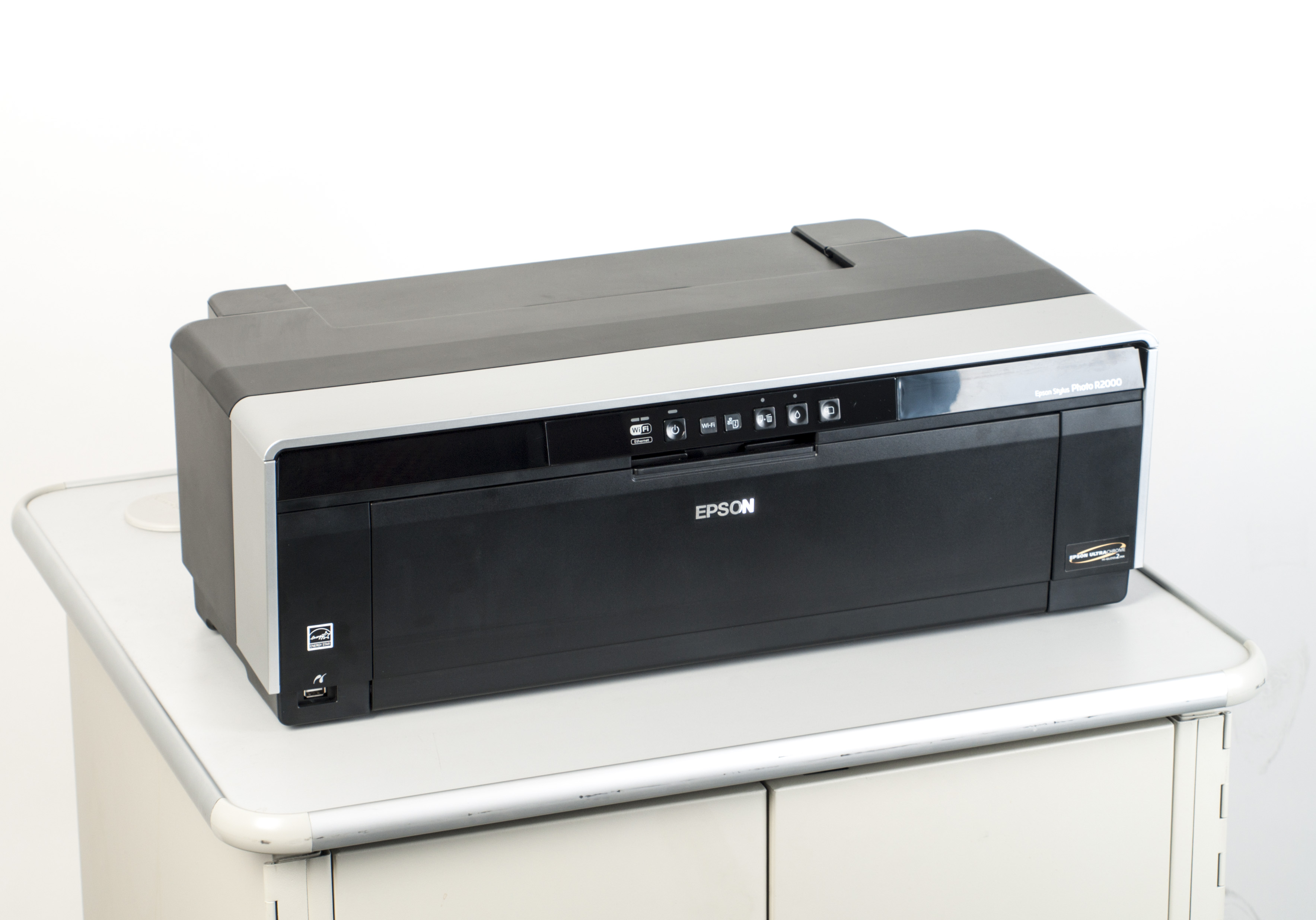
Epson R2000 printer

In 1994, Epson started to outsource sales representatives to help sell its products in retail stores in the United States. The same year, it started the Epson Weekend Warrior sales program. The purpose of the program was to help improve sales, improve retail sales reps' knowledge of Epson products, and to address Epson customer service in a retail environment. Reps were assigned on weekend shifts, typically around 12–20 hours a week. Epson started the Weekend Warrior program with TMG Marketing (now Mosaic Sales Solutions), and later with Keystone Marketing Inc, then returned to Mosaic, and switched again to Campaigners Inc. on June 24, 2007 after the Mosaic contract expired. The sales reps of Campaigners, Inc. are not outsourced; Epson hired rack jobbers to ensure retailers displayed products properly, freeing up its regular sales force to concentrate on profitable sales solutions to value-added resellers and system integrators, leaving "retail" to reps who did not require sales skills.

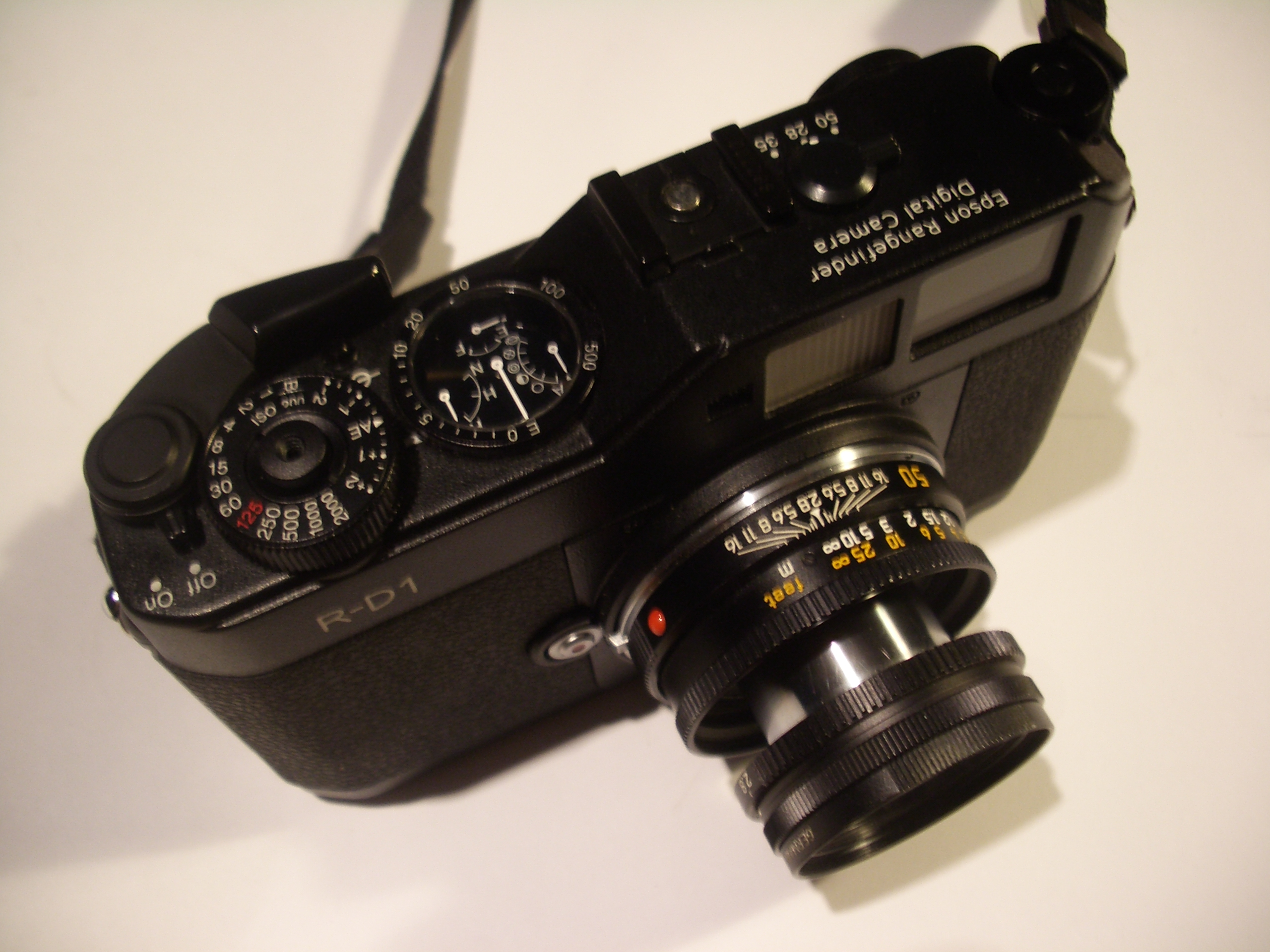
Epson R-D1 digital rangefinder camera

=== Computers ===
Epson entered the microcomputer market in 1982 with the HX-20 (HC-20 in Japan), which is also the world's first notebook computer. It entered the home computer market with the QX-10, a CP/M-compatible Z80 machine. By 1986, the company had shifted to the growing IBM PC compatible market with the Equity line. Epson also manufactured and sold NEC PC-9801 clones in Japan. In the United States, it marketed the ActionNote line of PC-compatible notebooks from 1993 to 1996. Epson withdrew from the international PC market in 1996. As of 2026, the company still continues to manufacture and sell PCs in Japan through its subsidiary, Epson Direct Corporation, focusing primarily on build-to-order (BTO) models for the business market.

=== 21st century ===
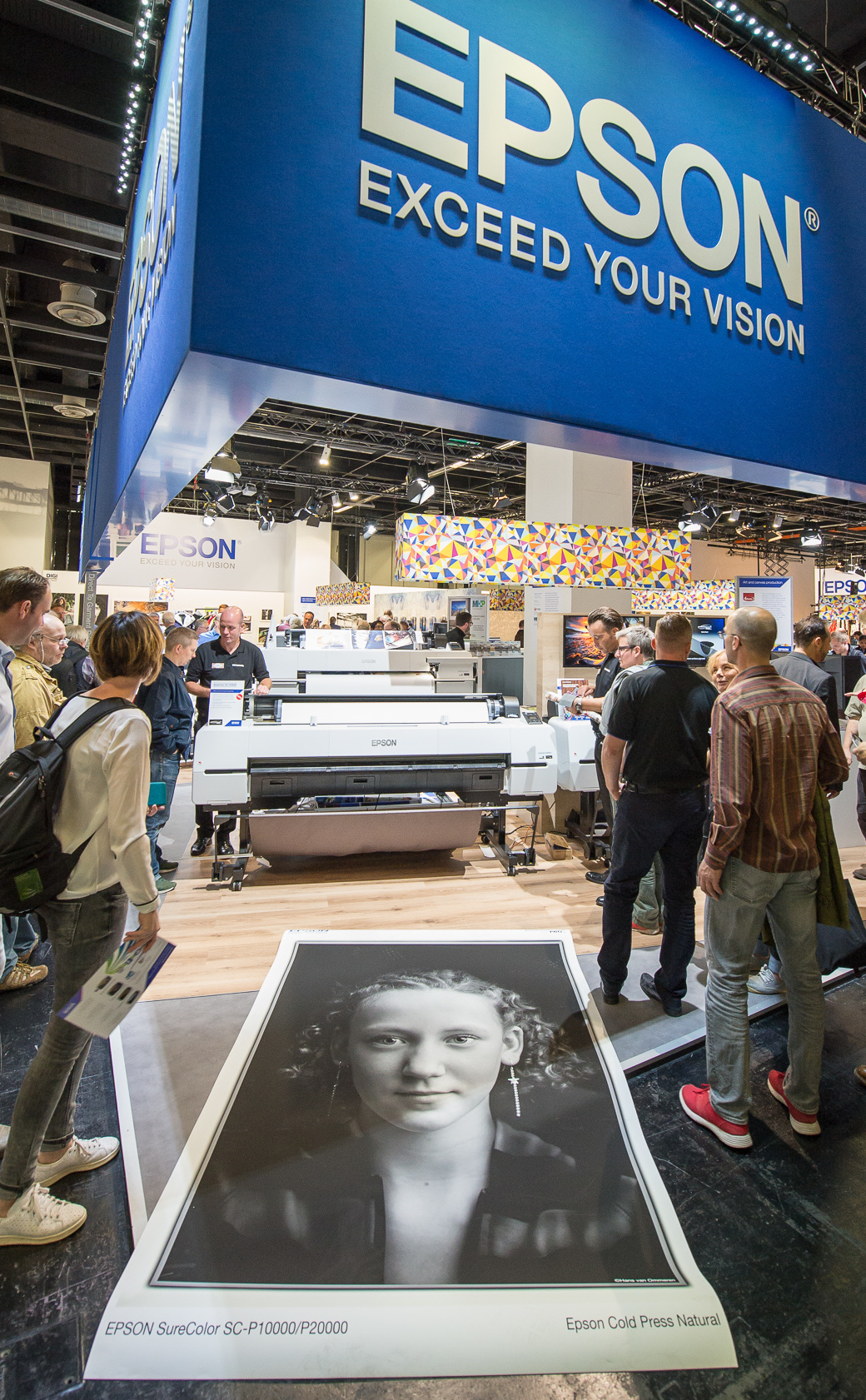
SureColor large format printer at Photokina, 2016

In June 2003, the company became public following its listing on the first section of the Tokyo Stock Exchange. Since 2017, the company is a constituent of the Nikkei Stock Average index. Although Seiko Group Corporation (f/k/a K. Hattori, Hattori Seiko, and Seiko Holdings) and the key members of the Hattori family still hold approximately 10% of the outstanding shares of Seiko Epson, the company is managed and operated completely independently from Seiko Group.

Seiko Watch Corporation, a division of Seiko Group, produces Seiko timepieces in-house through its subsidiaries as well as delegates the manufacture of some of its high-end watches (Seiko Astron, quartz and Spring Drive models of Grand Seiko, Credor, etc.) to Epson. The company makes some of Seiko's highest-grade watches at the Micro Artist Studio inside its Shiojiri Plant in Shiojiri, Nagano. Beside Seiko timepieces, Epson develops, designs, manufactures, markets, and sells watches under its own brands such as Orient, and Orient Star.

In 2004, Epson introduced its R-D1 (the first digital rangefinder camera on the market), which supports the Leica M mount and Leica M39 mount lenses with an adapter ring. Because its sensor is smaller than that of the standard 35 mm film frame, lenses mounted on the R-D1 have a narrower field of view by a factor of 1.53. In 2006, the R-D1 was replaced by the R-D1s, a cheaper version with identical hardware. Epson has released a firmware patch to bring the R-D1 up to the full functionality of its successor, being the first digital camera manufacturer to make such an upgrade available for free.

In November 2011, Epson entered the smartglasses market under the Moverio brand. The BT-100 was the first consumer smartglasses with transparent optics, which were popular with drone pilots for providing a first-person view while still being able to see the drone in the sky.

In September 2012, Epson introduced a printer called the Expression Premium XP-800 Small-in-One, with the ability to print wirelessly. The Expression brand name has since been used on various models of scanners. In the third quarter of 2012, Epson's global market share in the sale of printers, copiers and multifunction devices amounted to 15.20 percent.

In September 2015, Epson debuted the ET-4550 printer, which enables the user to pour ink into separate inkwells from ink bottles instead of cartridges.

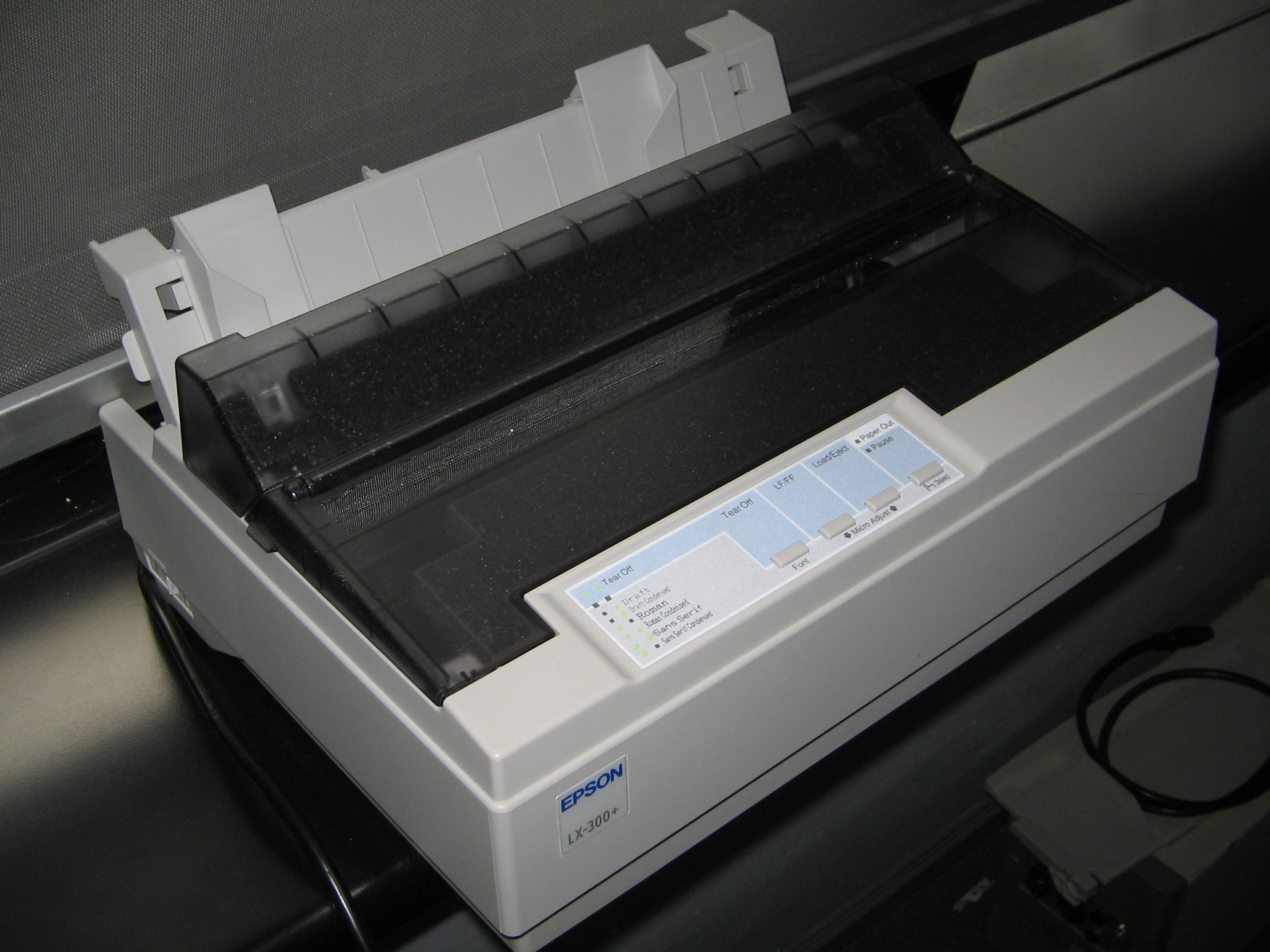
Epson LX-300+ dot matrix printer with optional colour upgrade

In 2016, Epson presented the large-format SureColor SC-P10000 ink printer; it prints with inks in ten colours on paper up to 44 inches (1.1 m) wide.

By 2025, Epson appeared to have the best (as judged by Consumer Reports) "all-in-one tank inkjet printers" on the market.

== ESC/P ==
To control its printers, Epson introduced a page description language, the Epson Standard Code for Printers (or ESC/P). It became a de facto industry standard for controlling print formatting during the era of dot matrix printers, whose popularity was initially started by the Epson MX-80.

== Robots ==
Epson Robots is the robotics design and manufacturing department of Epson. Seiko Epson produces some microcontrollers, such as the S1C63. In 1980, Epson started the production of robots.

== Ink cartridge controversies ==
In July 2003, a Dutch consumer association advised its 640,000 members to boycott Epson inkjet printers. The organisation alleged that Epson customers were unfairly charged for ink they could never use. Later that month, however, the group retracted its call for a nationwide boycott and issued a statement conceding that residual ink left in Epson cartridges was necessary for the printers to function properly.

Epson designed ink to be left in the cartridges (having done so ever since the introduction of piezoelectric print heads) due to the way the capping mechanism worked. If the capping mechanism dries out, then the heads risk getting clogged, necessitating expensive repairs.

Nonetheless, Epson America, Inc. settled a class action lawsuit brought before the Los Angeles Superior Court. It did not admit guilt, but agreed to refund $45 to anyone who purchased an Epson inkjet printer after April 8, 1999 (at least $20 of which must be used at Epson's e-Store).

According to IDG News Service, Epson filed a complaint with the U.S. International Trade Commission (ITC) in February 2006 against 24 companies that manufactured, imported, or distributed Epson-compatible ink cartridges for resale in the U.S. On March 30, 2007, ITC judge Paul Luckern issued an initial determination that the cartridges in question did infringe upon Epson's patents.

In 2015, it emerged that Epson printers reported cartridges to be empty when in fact up to 20% of their ink remains. As in 2003, the company responded:

The ink reporting and ink cartridges used in Epson's Stylus Pro 9900-series large format printer reports on ink levels and simultaneously protect the health of the printhead. During printhead maintenance or cleanings, if a cartridge doesn't have enough ink to complete the cleaning, a fuller cartridge must be used. However, users have the choice to swap out a cartridge that is reporting low levels for a fuller cartridge for the cleaning maintenance as needed, and then replace it with the original cartridge to use the remaining ink. The original cartridge does not need to be discarded.

== See also ==
- Inkjet technology
