= Seiko Instruments =

Japanese company

Seiko Instruments Inc.

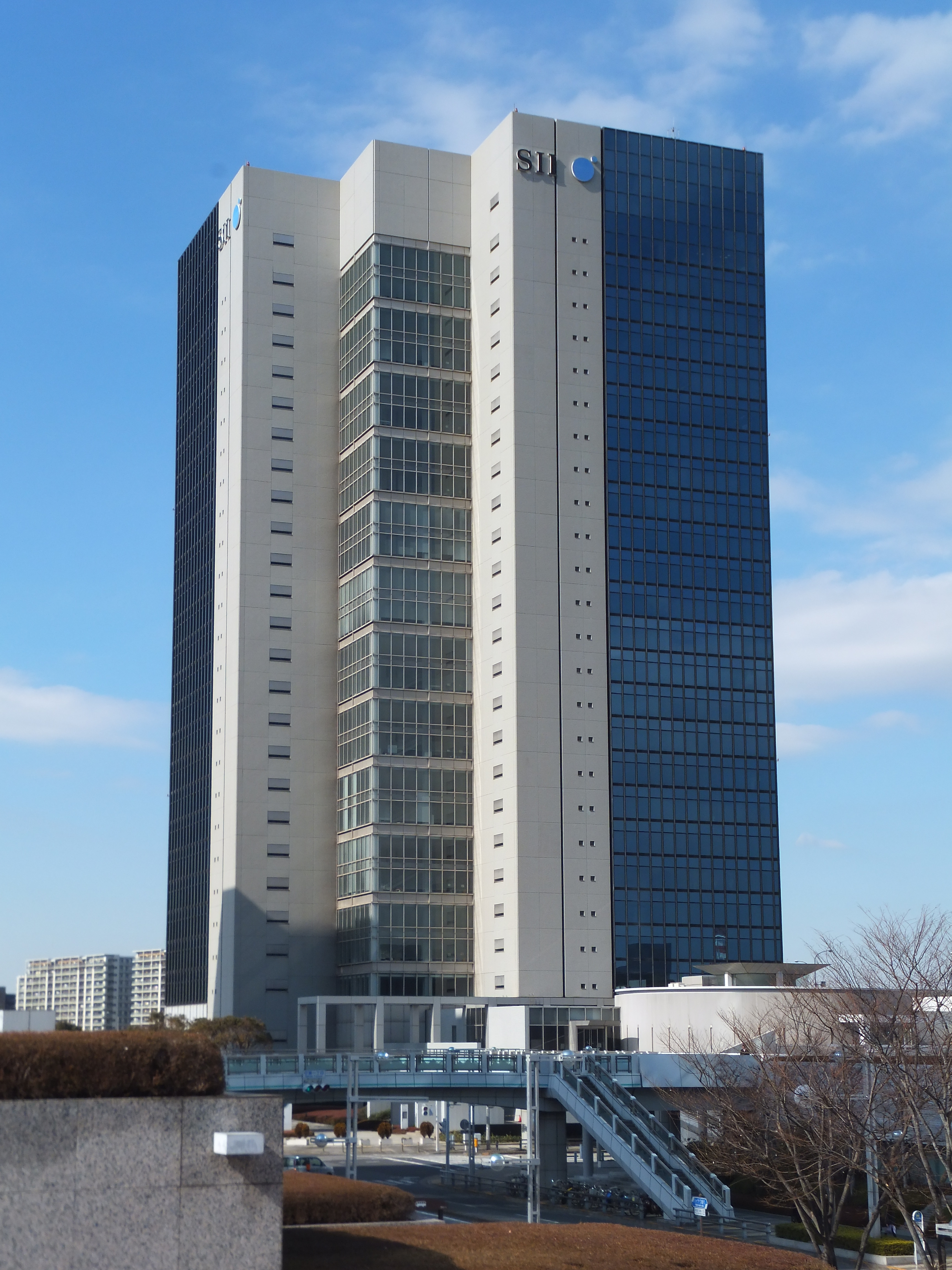
- Headquarters in Chiba
- Native name: セイコーインスツル株式会社
- Romanized name: Seikō Insutsuru Kabushiki-gaisha
- Type: Subsidiary
- Industry: Electronics
- Founded: 1937; 89 years ago Tokyo, Japan
- Headquarters: Chiba, Chiba, Japan
- Key people: Yoshinobu Nakamura (chairman); Tetsu Kobayashi (president)
- Products: Micromechatronics devices, Network components, Information-related equipment and services, Printers, Scientific instruments, etc.
- Revenue: ▼¥51,700 million (nonconsolidated); ¥239,100 million (consolidated) (Fiscal year ended March 31, 2020)
- Number of employees: 557 (nonconsolidated); 3,234 (consolidated) as of April 1, 2020
- Parent: Seiko Group Corporation
- Website: www.sii.co.jp

Seiko Instruments Inc. (セイコーインスツル株式会社, Seikō Insutsuru Kabushiki-gaisha) (SII) is a Japanese company, which develops and commercializes semiconductor, micromechatronics, and precision machining technologies. It is one of the business units of Seiko Group Corporation (f/k/a Seiko Holdings).

Headquartered in the Makuhari business district, Mihama-ku, Chiba City, Chiba Prefecture, Japan, the company manufactures and sells electronic components (crystal oscillators, micromechatronics devices, piezo inkjet printheads, microbatteries, supercapacitors), precision parts, analysis and measurement instruments, machine tools, factory automation systems, printers, etc.

== History ==
In 1937, Daini Seikosha Co., Ltd. (第二精工舎, Dai-ni-seikōsha), literally the second workshop for manufacturing Seiko timepieces, was established in Kamedo, Kōtō, Tokyo as a spin-off of the watch manufacturing division from Seikosha (精工舎, Seikōsha), so had been making the Seiko watches until 2020. The company changed its name to Seiko Instruments & Electronics Ltd. in 1983 and to the current name in 1997. Its Suwa Plant in Suwa, Nagano Prefecture spun off as Suwa Seikosha Co., Ltd. (諏訪精工舎, Suwa Seikōsha) in 1959 is now known as Seiko Epson (セイコーエプソン, Seikō Epuson).

On January 26, 2009, Seiko Instruments and Seiko Holdings announced that the two companies will be merged on October 1, 2009 through a share swap. Seiko Instruments became a wholly owned subsidiary of Seiko Holdings on the date that had been announced before.

Seiko had delegated a large portion of the manufacturing in its watch business to SII. Watches manufactured by SII were sold through the Seiko Watch Corporation, a subsidiary of Seiko Holdings Corporation. On April 1, 2020, the company transferred its watch business including its watch manufacturing subsidiaries Morioka Seiko Instruments, Ninohe Tokei Kogyo, Seiko Instruments Singapore, etc. to Seiko Watch.
