= Hewlett-Packard Raster Transfer Language =

The Hewlett-Packard Raster Transfer Language (HP RTL) is a subset of the Printer Command Language (PCL) language. It is used to embed true raster images (bitmaps) into plotter files. Modern plotters (like HP DesignJets) are raster devices, so they need a raster-based language. For backward compatibility they also support the HP-GL/2 (formerly HP-GL) vector language, so the HP RTL language is designed for mixing with the HP-GL/2 language.
