= Spring Drive =

Hybrid (mechanical and quartz) watch movement

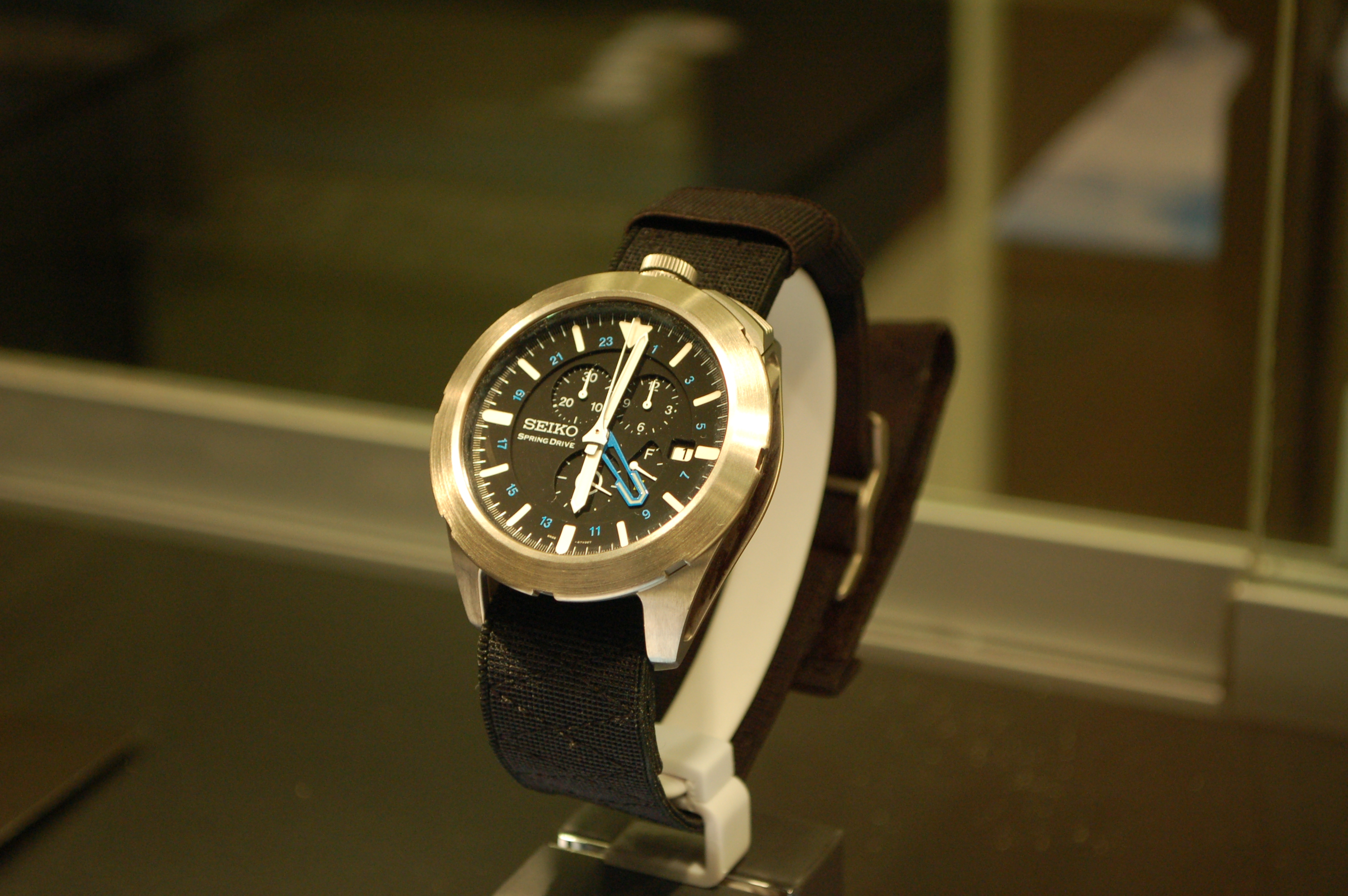
The Seiko Spacewalk is a limited edition Spring Drive model, designed specifically for use in space

Spring Drive is a name given to a series of watch movements produced by Epson in Shiojiri. The concept of using a mainspring to power a quartz timing package was first conceived in 1977 by Yoshikazu Akahane (赤羽 好和) at Suwa Seikosha (now a part of Epson after a 1985 merger). Specified to one second accuracy per day, the movement uses a conventional gear train as in traditional mechanical watches, but rather than an escapement and balance wheel, instead features Seiko's Tri-synchro Regulator system in which power delivery to the watch hands is regulated based on a reference quartz signal.

Commercially released in 1999, the movement is found in watches distributed by the Seiko Watch Corporation, including its Credor, Grand Seiko, Presage, and Prospex brands.

== Mechanics ==
The Spring Drive uses a conventional mainspring and barrel along with automatic or stem winding to store energy, just as in a mechanical watch. However, the escapement and balance wheel in mechanical watches is replaced by Seiko's Tri-synchro Regulator system, a phase-locked loop wherein a rotor, which Seiko refers to as a "glide wheel", is powered by the mainspring barrel. The glide wheel in turn powers a reference quartz crystal and accompanying integrated circuit which controls an electromagnetic brake which then regulates the rotational speed of the glide wheel itself.

The glide wheel is intended to rotate eight times per second; the rotational speed is sampled once every rotation and a variable braking force is continuously applied to maintain that target frequency. As the glide wheel directly powers the seconds hand of the watch, this results in a true continuously sweeping second hand – in contrast to the beats per time motion resulting from the back-and-forth movement of traditional mechanical watches or the tick of typical quartz watches.

== History ==
The design was first conceived by Yoshikazu Akahane at Suwa Seikosha in 1977 and patents were applied for it in 1982; in total, no fewer than 230 patents have been applied worldwide for this movement. Initial development was hindered by the high energy consumption of the reference quartz crystal and integrated circuit making a watch with a then-target 48-hour power reserve impossible; another attempt in 1993 was also unsuccessful for the same reason. It was not until a third attempt in 1997, using a quartz crystal and integrated circuit with energy consumption approximately one hundredth that used in the initial attempt in 1982, that a Spring Drive watch with sufficient power reserve was deemed feasible. Over 600 prototypes were produced during development.

The Spring Drive movement was announced publicly in 1997 and presented at the 1998 Basel Watch Fair. In December 1999, the first production models were made available in Japan as limited edition, manual-wind watches in both the Seiko and Credor brands. The initial models included two Seiko watches priced at ¥250,000 and ¥500,000, and one Credor watch priced at ¥1,000,000. The first non-limited model was released in Japan in 2002.

The 1st spring drive automatic-wind movement of Grand Seiko was released in September 2004, the reference number is SBGA001.

The first automatic-wind Spring Drive model was released in 2005, and coincided with the introduction of the Spring Drive movement to markets outside of Japan.

== Calibers ==
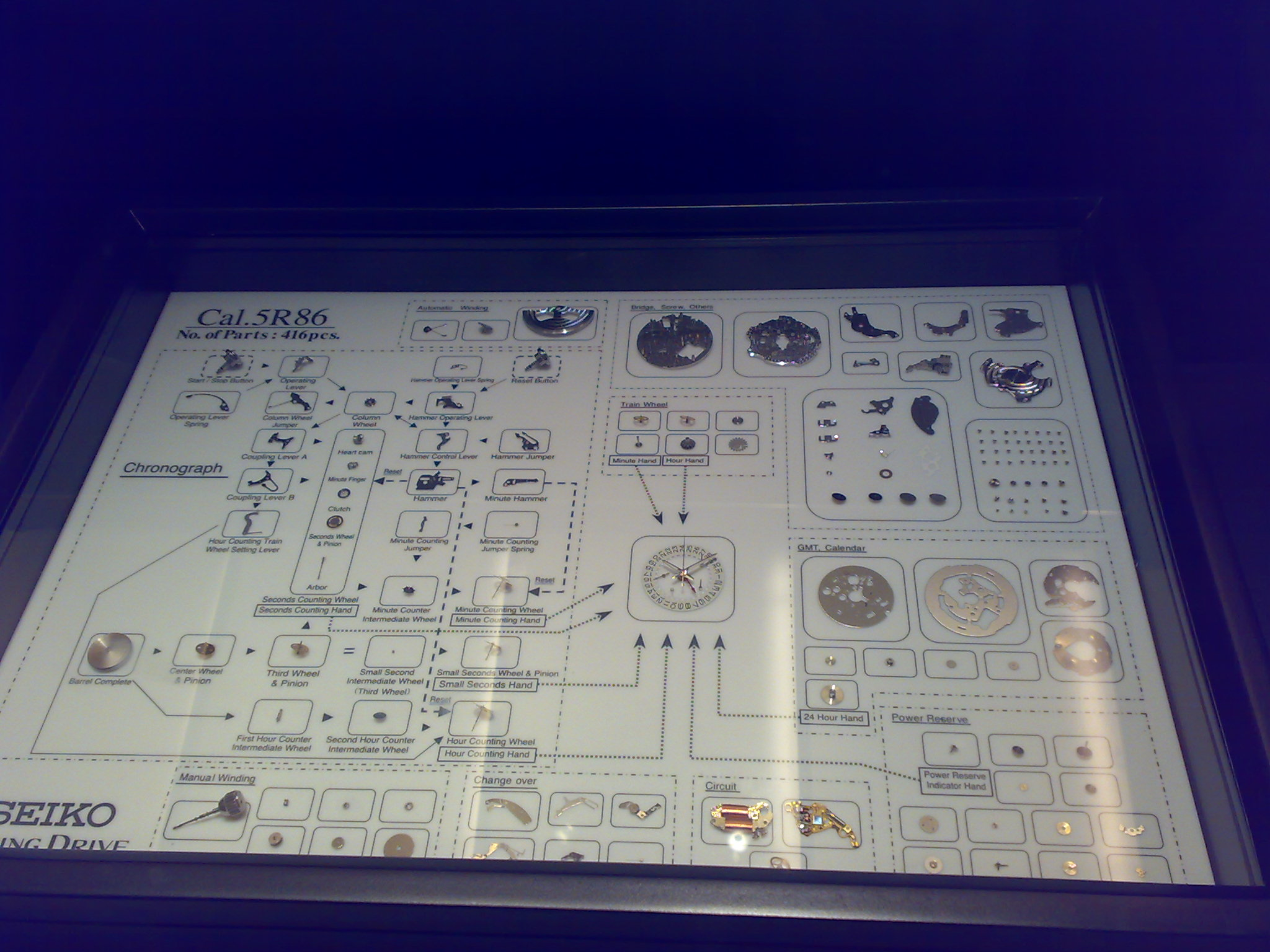
The parts of the 5R86 Spring Drive caliber

Established in 2000 within Seiko Epson's facility in Shiojiri, the Micro Artist Studio is responsible for the production of Spring Drive calibers that are particularly advanced in terms of technical and aesthetic craftsmanship. The studio manufactures movements used in Credor's complicated watches, such as the Sonnerie and Minute Repeater, as well as in the Grand Seiko Masterpiece Collection.

Early models, manual wind and 48h power reserve:

- 7R68 : 30 jewels, date.
- 7R78 : 30 jewels, date.
- 7R88 : 30 jewels, date.
- 7R99 : 32 jewels.

Current calibers with standard features. Time accuracy: monthly rate within ±15 sec (equivalent to a daily rate of ±1 sec), and power reserve (72h) indicator. (Exceptions apply to some models.)

- 5R64 : 32 jewels, date, small seconds hand.
- 5R65 : 30 jewels, date.
- 5R66 : 30 jewels, date, GMT.
- 5R67 : 30 jewels, Moon Phase indicator.
- 5R77 : 30 jewels, Moon Phase indicator.
- 5R85 : 49 jewels, date, Chronograph, Izul.
- 5R86 : 50 jewels, date, GMT, Chronograph, Spacewalk.
- 7R06 : 88 jewels, manual winding, Sonnerie. (Produced by the Micro Artist Studio)
- 7R08 : 44 jewels, manual winding, Eichi I. (Produced by the Micro Artist Studio)
- 7R11 : 112 jewels, manual winding, Minute Repeater. (Produced by the Micro Artist Studio)
- 7R14 : 41 jewels, manual winding, Eichi II. (Produced by the Micro Artist Studio)
- 9R01 : 56 jewels, manual winding. Power reserve 8 days (192h). Monthly rate within ±10 sec (±0.5 sec per day). (Produced by the Micro Artist Studio)
- 9R02 : 39 jewels, manual winding. Power reserve 84 hours. (Produced by the Micro Artist Studio)
- 9R15 : 30 jewels, date. Monthly rate within ±10 sec (±0.5 sec per day).
- 9R16 : 30 jewels, date. GMT. Monthly rate within ±10 sec (±0.5 sec per day).
- 9R31 : 30 jewels, manual wind.
- 9R65 : 30 jewels, date.
- 9R66 : 30 jewels, date, GMT.
- 9R84 : 41 jewels, date, Chronograph.
- 9R86 : 50 jewels, date, GMT, Chronograph.
- 9R96 : 50 jewels, date, GMT, Chronograph. Monthly rate within ±10 sec (±0.5 sec per day).

Current calibers with higher power reserve and higher accuracy. Time accuracy: monthly rate within ±10 sec (equivalent to a daily rate of ±0.5 sec) and power reserve (5 days) indicator.

- 9RA5 : 38 jewels, date.
- 9RA2 : 38 jewels, date. Rear power reserve indicator.

Current caliber with highest accuracy. Time accuracy: annual rate within ±20 sec (equivalent to a monthly rate of ±3 sec) and rear power reserve (3 days) indicator.

- 9RB2 : 34 jewels, date.
