= Refined Printing Command Stream =

Refined Printing Command Stream, also known as RPCS, is a vector-based printing/duplicating control protocol, designed for communication between Microsoft Windows PC clients, and several lines of Ricoh copiers. Drivers provided by Ricoh install the chosen copier to behave as a printer device.

The size-efficiency of the protocol is comparable to PCL6.

== Drivers ==
Ricoh offers RPCS based drivers for Windows, Mac OS and to some extent for Linux.

=== Linux ===
Drivers for Linux are provided only on the Japanese website. Instead of Aficio they are called IPSiO.

== See also ==
- Ricoh Hong Kong
- PCL - Printer Command Language, a printer control protocol family designed by Hewlett-Packard
