= Seikosha =

Branch of the Japanese company Seiko

Seikosha Co., Ltd.
- Native name

Japanese name
- Kanji: 精工舎
Transcriptions
- Revised Hepburn: Seikōsha
- Type: Subsidiary
- Founded: 1892; 134 years ago
- Defunct: 1996
- Fate: Divided into two new companies
- Successors: Seiko Precision Inc.; Seiko Clock Inc.
- Parent: Seiko

Seikosha Co., Ltd. (精工舎, Seikōsha) was a branch of the Japanese company Seiko that produced clocks, watches, shutters, computer printers and other devices. It was the root of the manufacturing companies of the Seiko Group.

== History ==
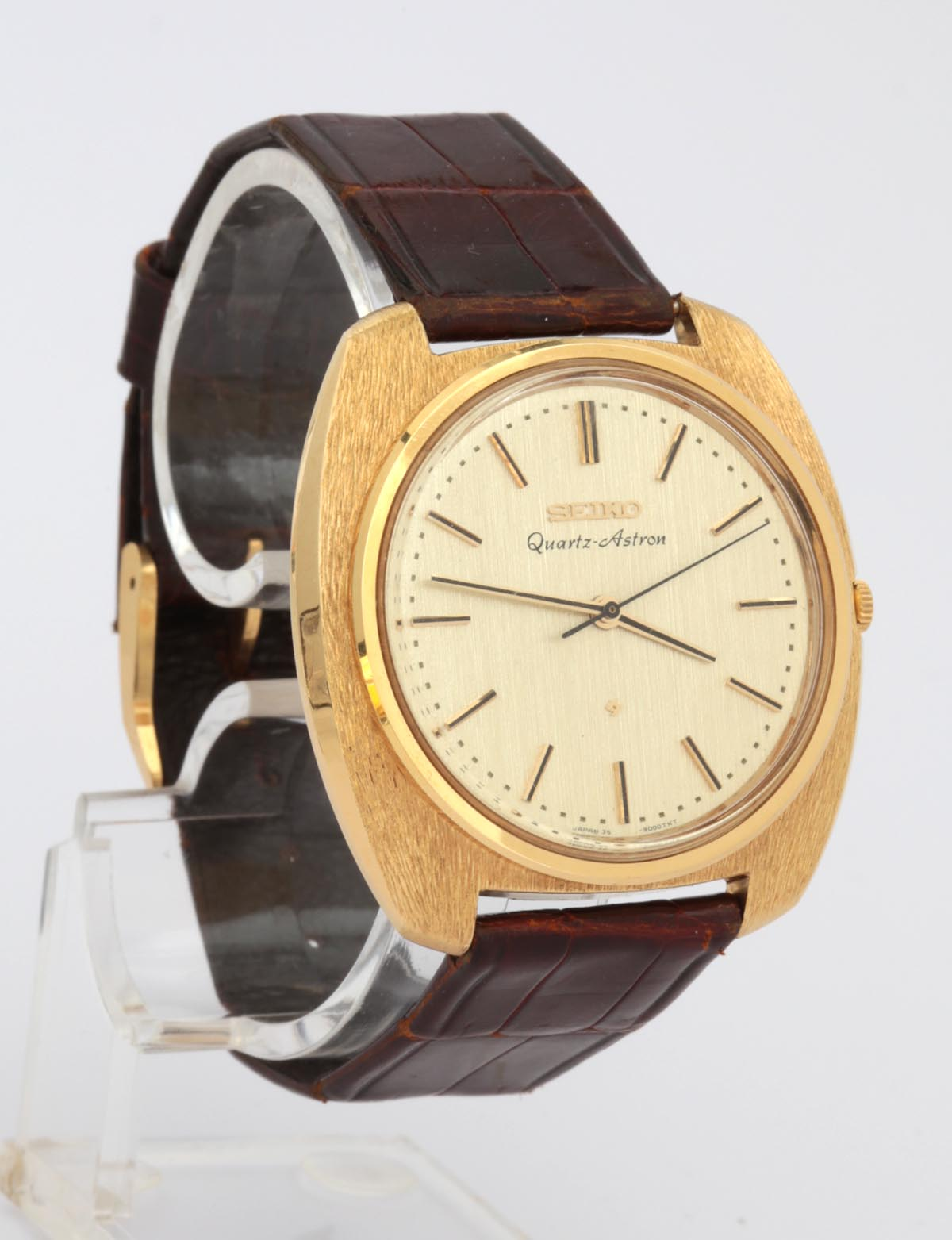
Seiko Quartz Astron 35SQ, the world's first commercial quartz watch developed by Suwa Seikosha

- 1881 — Kintarō Hattori opens the watch and jewelry shop "K. Hattori" (Hattori Tokeiten in Japanese; currently named Seiko Group Corporation) in the Ginza area of Tokyo, Japan.
- 1892 — Seikosha (精工舎) is established in Tokyo as the clock manufacturing arm of K. Hattori.
- 1917 — K. Hattori becomes a company (K. Hattori & Co., Ltd.).
- 1937 — The watch production division of Seikosha is split off as Daini Seikosha Co., Ltd. (第二精工舎, literally The Second Seikosha).
- 1942 — Daiwa Kogyo, Ltd. is founded in Suwa, Nagano by Hisao Yamazaki.
- 1943 — Daini Seikosha establishes a factory in Suwa for manufacturing watches with Daiwa Kogyo.
- 1959 — Daiwa Kogyo and the Suwa Plant of Daini Seikosha merge to form Suwa Seikosha Co., Ltd. (諏訪精工舎, literally The Seikosha in Suwa)
- 1961 — Shinshu Seiki Co., Ltd. is established as a subsidiary of Suwa Seikosha.
- 1970 — Seikosha is split off from K. Hattori & Co., Ltd., and Seikosha Co., Ltd. is incorporated.
- 1982 — K. Hattori & Co., Ltd. is renamed Hattori Seiko Co., Ltd.
- 1982 — Shinshu Seiki is renamed Epson Corporation.
- 1983 — Daini Seikosha is renamed Seiko Instruments & Electronics Ltd.
- 1985 — Suwa Seikosha and Epson merge to form Seiko Epson Corporation.
- 1990 — Hattori Seiko Co., Ltd. is renamed Seiko Corporation.
- 1996 — Seikosha Co., Ltd. is divided into Seiko Precision Inc. and Seiko Clock Inc.
- 1997 — Seiko Instruments & Electronics is renamed Seiko Instruments Inc.
- 2007 — Seiko Corporation is renamed Seiko Holdings Corporation.
- 2009 — Seiko Instruments becomes a wholly owned subsidiary of Seiko Holdings.
- 2020 — Seiko Precision transfers its business operations to Seiko Time Systems Inc. and Seiko Solutions Inc. and dissolves.
- 2020 — Seiko Instruments transfers its watch business (development and manufacturing of the Seiko timepieces) to Seiko Watch Corporation.
- 2021 — Seiko Clock is merged with Seiko Time Systems to form Seiko Time Creation Inc.
- 2022 — Seiko Holdings Corporation is renamed Seiko Group Corporation.
