= Printer Command Language =

Page description language

- Internet media type: application/vnd.hp-PCL

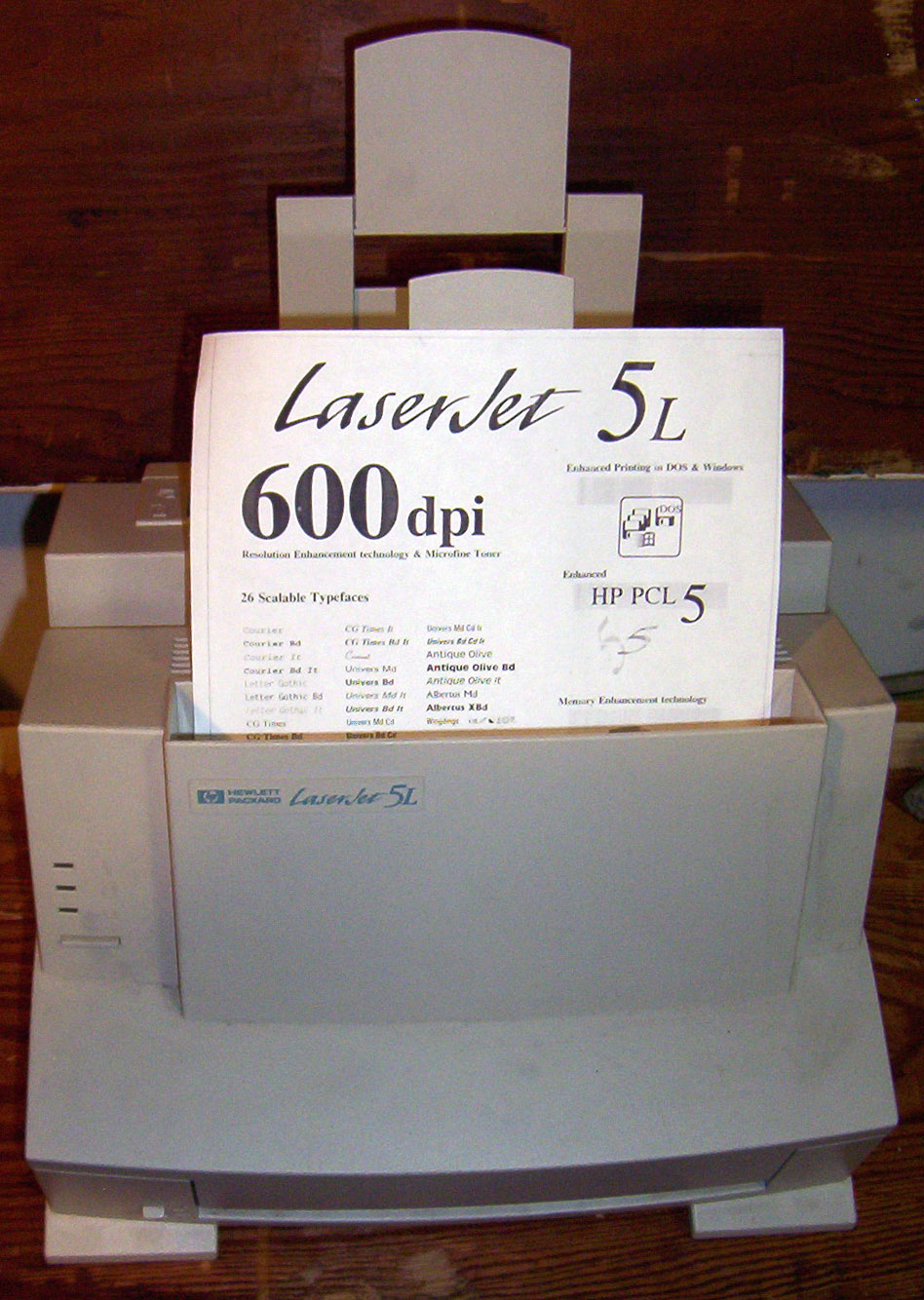

Printer Command Language, more commonly referred to as PCL, is a page description language (PDL) developed by Hewlett-Packard as a printer protocol and has become a de facto industry standard. Originally developed for early inkjet printers in 1984, PCL has been released in varying "levels" for thermal, dot matrix, and page printers. HP-GL/2 and PJL are supported by later versions of PCL.

PCL is occasionally and incorrectly said to be an abbreviation for Printer Control Language which actually is another term for page description language.

== PCL levels 1 through 5 overview ==
PCL levels 1 through 5e/5c are command-based languages using control sequences that are processed and interpreted in the order they are received. At a consumer level, PCL data streams are generated by a print driver. PCL output can also be generated by custom applications.

- PCL 1 was introduced in 1984 on the HP ThinkJet 2225 and provides basic text and graphics printing with a maximum resolution of 150 dpi (dots per inch).
- PCL 1+ was released with the HP QuietJet 2227.
- PCL 2 added Electronic Data Processing/Transaction functionality.
- PCL 3 was introduced in 1984 with the original HP LaserJet. This added support for bitmap fonts and increased the maximum resolution to 300 dpi. Other products with PCL 3 support were the HP DeskJet inkjet printer, and HP 2932 series and HP RuggedWriter 2235 dot matrix printers. PCL 3 is still in use on several impact printers which replaced the obsolete HP models.
- PCL 3+ (mono) and PCL 3c+ (color) are used on later HP DeskJet and HP PhotoSmart products.
- PCL 3GUI is used in the HP DesignJet, some DeskJet series printers, and OfficeJet series printers. It uses a compressed raster format that is not compatible with standard PCL 3.
- PCL 4 was introduced on the HP LaserJet Plus in 1985, adding macros, larger bitmapped fonts and graphics. PCL 4 is still popular for many applications.
- PCL 5 was released on the HP LaserJet III in March 1990, adding Intellifont font scaling (developed by Compugraphic, now part of Agfa), outline fonts and HP-GL/2 (vector) graphics.
- PCL 5e (PCL 5 enhanced) was released on the HP LaserJet 4 in October 1992 and added bi-directional communication between the printer and the PC and Windows fonts.
- PCL 5c introduced color support on the HP PaintJet 300XL and HP Color LaserJet in 1992.

== PCL 6 overview ==
HP introduced PCL 6 around 1995 with the HP LaserJet 5 printers. It consists of:

- PCL 6 "Enhanced": An object-oriented PDL optimized for printing from GUI interfaces such as Windows and compressed to optimize throughput. Formerly known as PCL XL or PXL.
- PCL 6 Standard: Equivalent to PCL 5e or PCL 5c, intended to provide backward compatibility.
- Font synthesis: Provides scalable fonts, font management and storage of forms and fonts.

PCL 6 "Enhanced" architecture was altered to be more modular and more easily modified for future HP printers, to print complex graphics faster, reduce network traffic, and provide higher quality. In early implementations, HP did not market PCL 6 well, thus causing some confusion in terminology. PCL XL was renamed to PCL 6 Enhanced, but many third-party products still use the older term.

Some products may claim to be PCL 6 compliant, but may not include the PCL 5 backward compatibility. PCL 6 Enhanced is primarily generated by the printer drivers under Windows and CUPS. Due to its structure and compression methodology, custom applications rarely use it directly.

PCL 6 Enhanced is a stack-based, object-oriented protocol, similar to PostScript. However, it is restricted to binary encoding as opposed to PostScript, which can be sent either as binary code or as plain text. The plain-text commands and code examples shown in the PCL programming documentation are meant to be compiled with a utility like HP's JetASM before being sent to a printer.

PCL 6 Enhanced is designed to match the drawing model of Windows GDI. In this way, the Windows printer driver simply passes through GDI commands with very little modification, leading to faster return-to-application times. Microsoft has extended this concept with its next-generation XPS format, and printer implementations of XPS are being developed. This is not a new idea: it is comparable with Display PostScript and Apple's Quartz, and is in contrast to "GDI printers" where a compressed bitmap is sent to the printer.

=== PCL 6 class revisions ===
==== Class 1.1 ====
- Draw tools: Support drawing lines, arcs/ellipses/chords, (rounded) rectangles, polygons, Bézier paths, clipped paths, raster images, scanlines, raster operations.
- Color handling: Support 1/4/8-bit palettes, RGB/grey color space. Support custom halftone patterns (max 256 patterns).
- Compression: Supports RLE.
- Units of measurement: Inch, millimeter, tenth of millimeter.
- Paper handling: Support custom or predefined sets of paper size, including common Letter, Legal, A4, etc. Can choose paper from manual feed, trays, cassettes. Paper can be duplexed horizontally or vertically. Paper can be oriented in portrait, landscape, or 180 degree rotation of the former two.
- Fonts: Supports bitmap or TrueType fonts, using 8– or 16–bit code points. Choosing character set uses a different symbol set code from PCL 5. When a bitmap font is used, many scaling commands are unavailable. When a TrueType font is used, variable length descriptors and continuation blocks are not supported. Outline fonts can be rotated, scaled, or sheared.

==== Class 2.0 ====
- Compression: Added JPEG compression. A proprietary variant of JPEG-like compression optimized for integer hardware called JetReady is used in a few HP Color LaserJet models (e.g.the 3500, 3550, and 3600). Those models require Class 3.0 inputs.
- Paper handling: Media can be redirected to different output bins (up to 256). Added A6 and Japanese B6 preset media sizes. Added third cassette preset, 248 external tray media sources.
- Font: Text can be written vertically.

==== Class 2.1 ====
- Color handling: Added color matching feature.
- Compression: Added Delta Row.
- Paper handling: Orientation, media size are optional when declaring a new page. Added B5, JIS 8K, JIS 16K, and JIS Exec paper sizes.

==== Class 2.2 ====
- Compression: Added JFIF.

==== Class 3.0 ====
- Color handling: Allows using different halftone settings for vector or raster graphics, text. Supports adaptive halftoning.
- Protocol: Supports PCL passthrough, allowing PCL 5 features to be used by PCL 6 streams. However, some PCL 6 states are not preserved when using this feature.
- Font: Supports PCL fonts.

JetReady printers (CLJ 3500/3550/3600) use undocumented extensions but otherwise mandate Class 3.0 inputs.

== PJL overview ==
PJL (Printer Job Language) was introduced on the HP LaserJet IIIsi. PJL adds job level controls, such as printer language switching, job separation, environment commands, status feedback, device attendance and file system commands.

== See also ==
- CaPSL
- Encapsulated PostScript
- Foomatic
- Hewlett-Packard Raster Transfer Language (HP RTL)
- GNU Plotutils
- PostScript Printer Description
- Ghostscript
