= Grand Seiko Hi-Beat =

Series of high-beat automatic mechanical watches by Grand Seiko

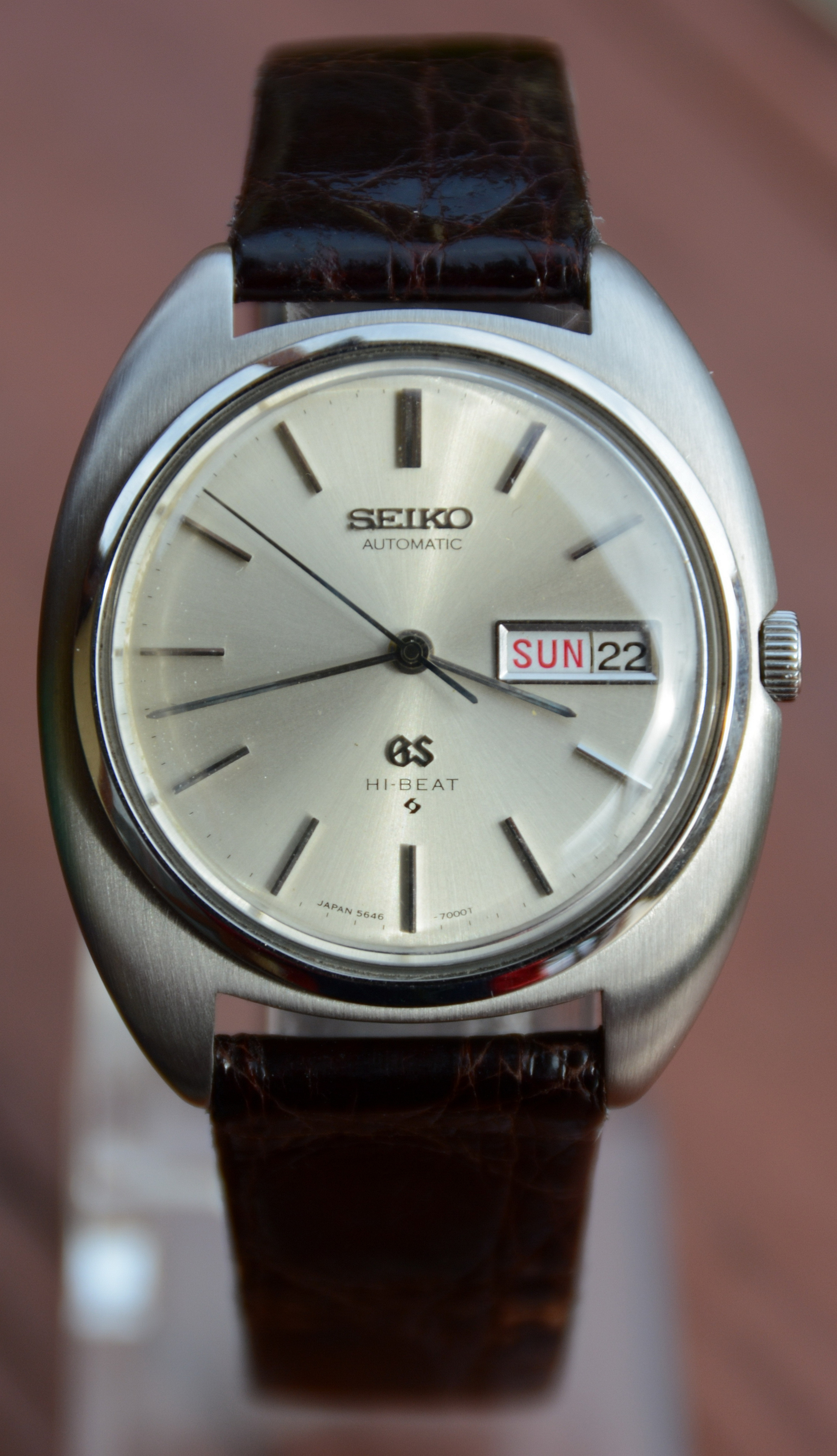
- A vintage watch from Hi-Beat line of watches
- Type: Automatic Hi-Beat
- Display: Analogue
- Introduced: 1967

The Grand Seiko Hi-Beat is a line of high-frequency automatic mechanical watches engineered and manufactured by Japanese watchmaker Grand Seiko. The series was created at Seiko's Suwa factory (Suwa Seikosha) in Nagano Prefecture and launched in 1967. These watches feature movements that beat at 36,000 vibrations per hour (10 beats per second) resulting in smoother seconds-hand sweep.

== Awards ==
Seiko Hi-Beat watches have received numerous watchmaking and design awards including iF and Red Dot.

In 2016, Japanese government awarded yellow ribbon Medal of Honor to the Seiko engineer who designed several Hi-Beat watch models.

== See also ==
- Seiko
- Mechanical watch
