= Seiko =

Japanese manufacturing company

Seiko Group Corporation

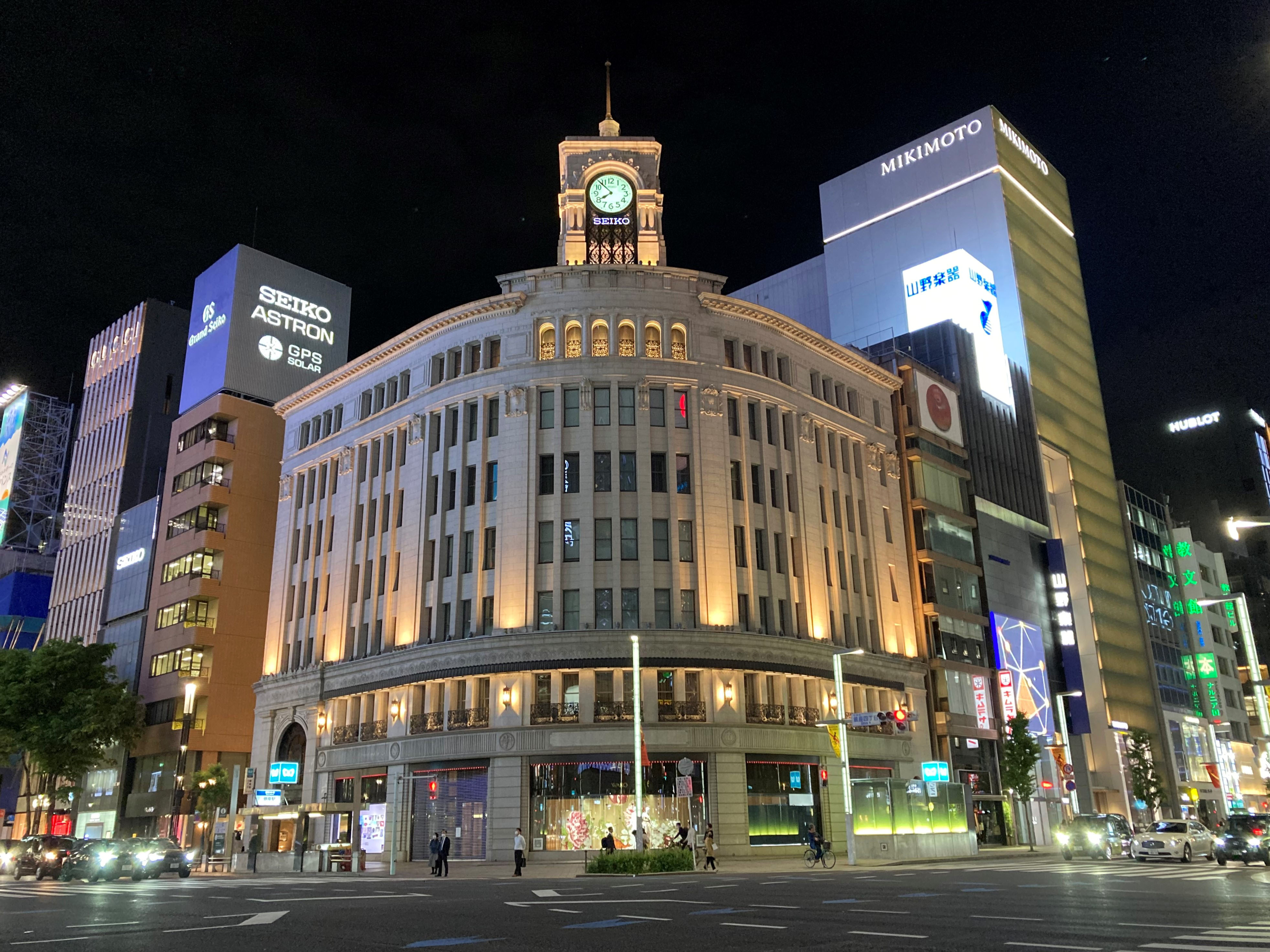
- The current Seiko House Ginza (Ginza Wako) building was completed in 1932 as the headquarters of K. Hattori (known in Japan as Hattori Tokeiten, now Seiko).
- Native name: セイコーグループ株式会社
- Romanized name: Seikō Gurūpu kabushiki gaisha
- Formerly: K. Hattori & Co. (1881–1917); K. Hattori & Co., Ltd. (1917–1983); Hattori Seiko Co., Ltd. (1983–1997); Seiko Corporation (1997–2007); Seiko Holdings Corporation (2007–2022)
- Type: Public
- Traded as: TYO: 8050
- ISIN: JP3414700009
- Industry: Electronics; Watchmaking
- Founded: 1881; 145 years ago in Chūō, Tokyo, Japan
- Founder: Kintarō Hattori
- Headquarters: Ginza, Chūō, Tokyo, Japan
- Key people: Shinji Hattori Chairman and CEO of Seiko Group; Chairman of Seiko Watch; Shuji Takahashi President of Seiko Group; Akio Naito Executive Vice President of Seiko Group; President of Seiko Watch
- Products: Watches; clocks; electronic devices; semiconductors; metronomes
- Revenue: ▲¥304.7 billion (FY2024)
- Operating income: ▲¥21.2 billion (FY2024)
- Net income: ▲¥13.3 billion (FY2024)
- Total assets: ▲¥369.2 billion (FY2024)
- Total equity: ▲¥156.0 billion (FY2024)
- Owner: Hattori family
- Number of employees: 11,740 (as of 31 March 2024)
- Subsidiaries: Seiko Watch Corporation; Seiko Instruments Inc.; Seiko Solutions Inc.; Seiko Time Creation Inc.; Wako Co., Ltd.; Seiko NPC Corporation; Seiko Future Creation Inc.
- Website: seiko.co.jp

Seiko Group Corporation (セイコーグループ株式会社, Seikō Gurūpu kabushiki gaisha), commonly known as Seiko (/ˈseɪkoʊ/ SAY-koh, Japanese: [seːkoː]), is a Japanese maker of watches, clocks, electronic devices, and semiconductors. Founded in 1881 by Kintarō Hattori in Tokyo, Seiko introduced the world's first commercial quartz wristwatch in 1969.

Seiko is widely known for its wristwatches. Seiko and Rolex are the only two watch companies considered to be vertically integrated. Seiko is able to design and develop all the components of a watch, as well as assemble, adjust, inspect and ship them in-house. Seiko's mechanical watches consist of approximately 200 parts, and the company has the technology and production facilities to design and manufacture all of these parts internally.

The company was incorporated (K. Hattori & Co., Ltd.) in 1917 and renamed Hattori Seiko Co., Ltd. in 1983 and Seiko Corporation in 1997. After reconstructing and creating its operating subsidiaries (such as Seiko Watch Corporation and Seiko Clock Inc.), it became a holding company in 2001 and was renamed Seiko Holdings Corporation on July 1, 2007. Seiko Holdings Corporation was renamed Seiko Group Corporation as of October 1, 2022.

Seiko watches were originally produced by two Hattori family companies (not subsidiaries of K. Hattori & Co); one was Daini Seikosha Co. (now known as Seiko Instruments Inc., a subsidiary of Seiko Holdings since 2009) and the other was Suwa Seikosha Co. (now known as Seiko Epson Corporation, an independent publicly traded company). Having two companies both producing the same brand of watch enabled Seiko to improve technology through competition and hedge risk. It also reduced risk of production problems, since one company can increase production in the case of decreased production in the other parties. Seiko remains one of the world's most recognised watchmaking brands.

In Ginza, where the company was founded, there are several Seiko-related facilities in addition to Seiko House Ginza, including the Seiko Museum and Seiko Dream Square. Several Seiko boutiques and department stores in the area frequently offer Ginza-exclusive models.

== History ==
=== 1881 founding to 1929 ===
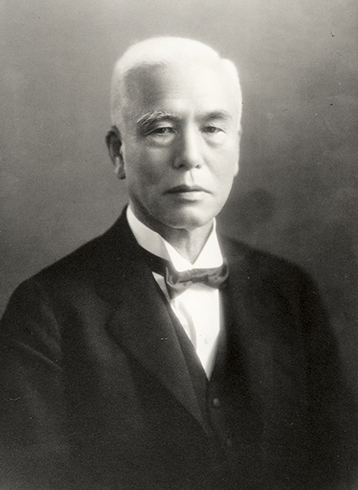
Portrait of Kintarō Hattori, 1916

In 1881, Seiko founder Kintarō Hattori opened a watch and jewelry shop called "K. Hattori" (服部時計店) in Tokyo. Kintarō Hattori had been working as clockmaker apprentice since the age of 13, with multiple stints in different watch shops, such as “Kobayashi Clock Shop”, run by an expert technician named Seijiro Sakurai; “Kameda Clock Shop” in Nihonbashi; and “Sakata Clock Shop” in Ueno, where he learned how to both sell and repair timepieces.

Around the time of Seiko's founding, watchmakers in Tokyo, Osaka, and Nagoya were studying and producing pocket watches based on Western products. Japanese wholesalers needed to purchase all the imported timepieces from foreign trading companies established in Yokohama, Kobe, and other open port areas.

In 1885, Hattori began dealing directly with these foreign trading firms in the Yokohama settlement focused on the wholesaling and retailing of western (imported) timepieces and machinery.

Over the years, Hattori developed a close partnership with multiple foreign trading firms, including C&J Favre-Brandt, F. Perregaux & Co., Zanuti & Cie. and Siber & Brennwald, allowing him to obtain exclusive imported timepieces and machinery, which was not available elsewhere at that time.

Hattori's shop became increasingly popular due to the rarity of the imported watches the shop was selling, which were not found anywhere else in Japan. The growing success allowed him to relocate the company to the main street of Ginza (Tokyo), still the epicenter of commerce in Japan to this day.

In 1891, 10 years after the establishment of K. Hattori & Co., the 31-year-old Kintaro was appointed director of the Tokyo Clockmaker and Watchmaker Association and member of Tokyo Chamber of Commerce.

In 1892, Hattori began to produce clocks under the name Seikosha (精工舎, Seikōsha), meaning, roughly, "House of Exquisite Workmanship." According to Seiko's official company history, titled A Journey In Time: The Remarkable Story of Seiko (2003), Seiko is a Japanese word meaning "exquisite" (精巧, Seikō); it is homophonous with the word for "success" (成功, Seikō).

In 1895, the watch dealer purchased the corner of Ginza 4-chome (the present-day location of WAKO), and constructed a building with a clock tower (16 meters from top to bottom), setting up shop at the new address.

Seiko launched its first in-house pocket watch, the Timekeeper, in 1895; the first Japanese-made wristwatch, the Laurel, in 1913; and the first Seiko-branded wristwatch in 1924. Wristwatches and pocket watches completed in 1923 were provisionally given the name "Glory." However, since its pronunciation was similar to "gorori" (ゴロリ), a Japanese onomatopoeia for tumbling, which was considered unlucky, it was decided that the brand name for watches to be mass-produced from 1924 would be "Seiko."

In 1929, the Seiko pocket watch was adopted as the official watch for the drivers of Japanese Government Railways.

=== 1930 to 1990 ===
Military watches, notably the "Seikosha Type 93 Tensoku-Dokei" produced for Japanese troops during World War II were manufactured by Seiko, which by 1938, produced 1.2 million timepieces a year. The scarcity of raw materials during the war diverted much of Seiko's production to on-board instruments for military aircraft and ships. In contrast to Japan, Germany utilized both domestically produced and Swiss-produced watches. Japan's isolation in the Pacific meant the country could not rely on importing foreign timepieces.

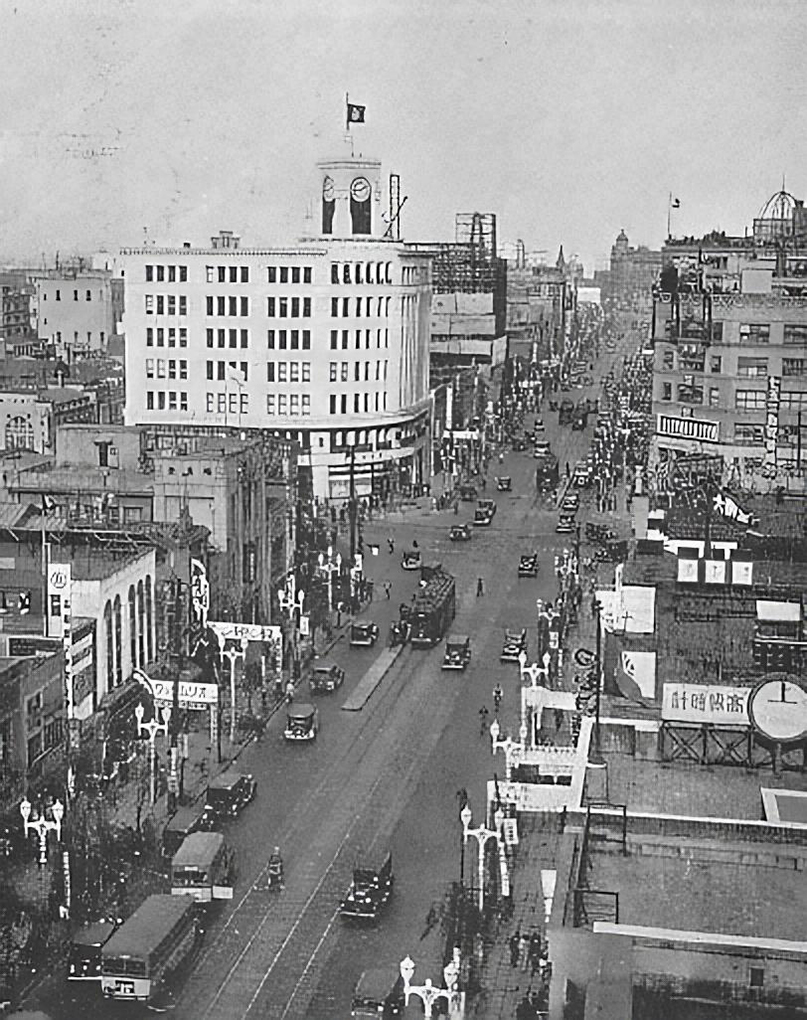
Seiko Group in 1933

In 1951, Seiko broadcast its first radio commercial in Japan, and when Japan's first commercial television station opened in 1953, it broadcast Japan's first television commercial. The first Japanese commercial was supposed to be broadcast as a time signal at noon, but the video technician mishandled the equipment and the commercial lasted only three seconds, and it was rebroadcast at 7:00 p.m. the same day.

In 1956, Seiko launched Japan's first automatic wristwatch, the Automatic. The retail price at the time was 13,500 yen, more than three times the price of men's wristwatches, which were generally in the 4,000 yen range. In the same year, the company released the Marvel, which represented a significant improvement in accuracy, quality, and productivity over the previous model. This was achieved by increasing the outer diameter of the movement compared to the previous model.

In 1958, Seiko developed the 'Dia-Shock' anti-shock device.

In 1959, Seiko launched the Gyro Marvel, which featured a revolutionary self-winding mechanism, the Magic Lever, developed by Seiko. The Magic Lever was simple in structure and had high winding performance, and popularized automatic watches among the general public.

In 1960, Seiko released the Grand Seiko, aimed to be the most accurate wristwatch in the world.

Seiko quickly developed quartz technology in preparation for the 1964 Tokyo Olympics, and in 1963 launched the Seiko Crystal Chronometer, a dramatically smaller version of its previous quartz clock. The quartz clock Seiko had supplied to a broadcasting station in 1959 was about the size of a wardrobe, but this new product ran on two batteries and was portable. At the Tokyo Olympics, Seiko's mechanical stopwatches were selected as the official Olympic watches due to their high accuracy.

Seiko launched Japan's first chronograph wristwatch, the Crown Chronograph, in 1964, Japan's first world time wristwatch in the same year, and Japan's first diver's wristwatch in 1965. In 1967, Japan's first diver's watch with 300m water resistance was launched.

In 1967, Seiko won second and third place in a watch accuracy competition at a Neuchâtel Observatory competition; the competition was canceled after that year.

In 1968, Seiko took first place in a Geneva Observatory competition with a score of 58.19, surpassing all previous records. Swiss companies ranked first to third for their quartz movements and Seiko ranked fourth to tenth for its mechanical movements. In the competition, there were special movements for the competition.

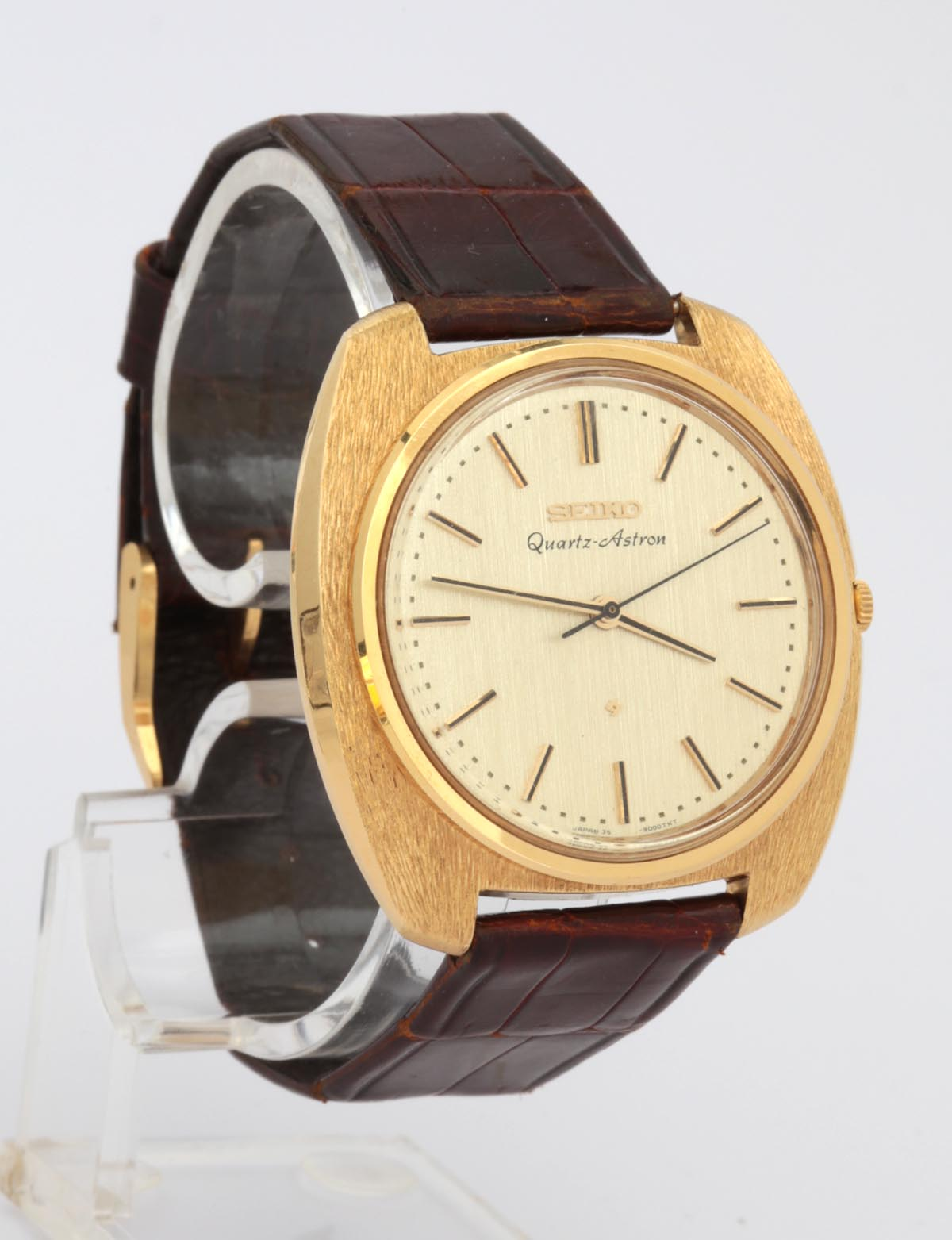
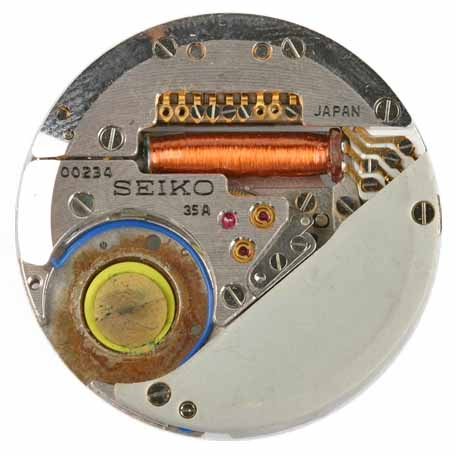
Quartz wristwatch movement Caliber 35A (right) developed by Suwa Seikosha in 1969, used in the Seiko Astron (left)

In 1969, Seiko released several wristwatches that the company now regards as historically significant models. The Astron became the world’s first commercially available quartz wristwatch, with a price tag comparable to that of a mid-sized car at the time. The release of the Astron triggered what became known as the "Quartz Revolution" or "Quartz Crisis," during which the Swiss watch industry suffered a major decline from the 1970s through the early 1980s. The 5 Sports Speed Timer was the world’s first commercially available automatic chronograph, achieving great success due to its compact design and practical functionality. Although Zenith had previously unveiled a prototype automatic chronograph, Seiko was the first to bring one to market. Seiko also introduced the Grand Seiko V.F.A. (Very Fine Adjusted), a mechanical watch with ultra-high accuracy rated at ±2 seconds per day, and the U.T.D. (Ultra Thin Dress), a mechanical watch with an exceptionally thin movement measuring just 1.98 mm.

Since the 1970s, Seiko has introduced a variety of wristwatches with various world firsts: in 1973, Seiko introduced the world's first wristwatch with a LCD display capable of displaying six digits for hours, minutes and seconds; in 1975, Seiko introduced the world's first digital watch with a stopwatch function and a diver's watch with a titanium case. In 1978, Seiko introduced the world's first quartz diver's watch with a water resistance of 600 meters; in 1982, the world's first wristwatch with a television; in 1983, the world's first wristwatch with a record-and-play function and an analog quartz chronograph; in 1984, the world's first wristwatch computer; and in 1986, the world's first diver's watch with a ceramic case water-resistant to 1000 meters.

In 1974, Seiko launched Credor, a luxury brand using precious metals and jewelry, and in 1979, Alba, a low-priced brand for young people.

In 1985, Orient and Seiko established a joint factory.

In 1986, Baselworld allowed non-European manufacturers to participate, and Seiko began exhibiting that year.

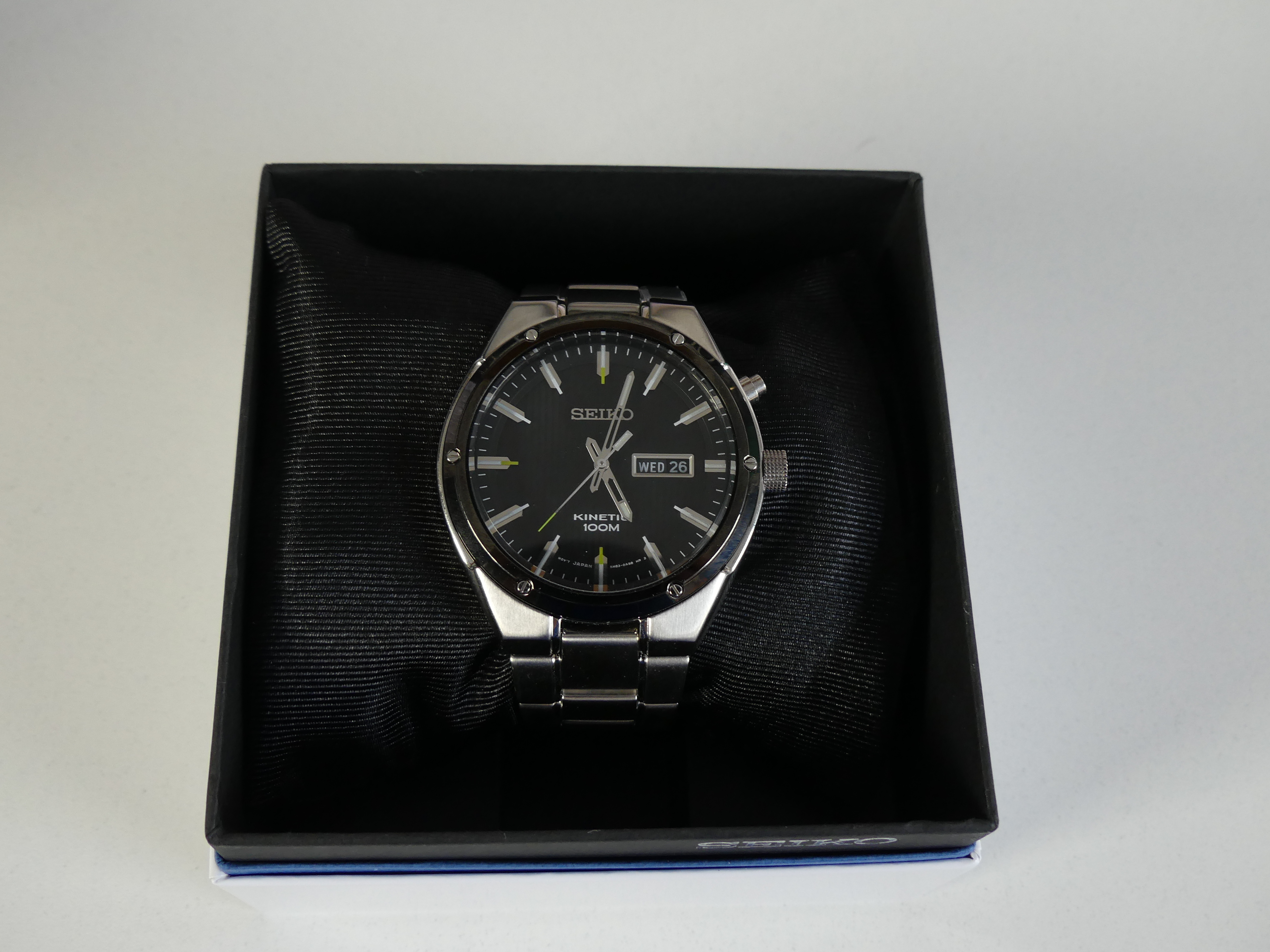
Kinetic SMY151P1

In 1988, Seiko invented the world's first wristwatch with an innovative mechanism called "Auto Quartz", in which a rotating oscillating weight rotates in response to the wearer's arm movements, generating electricity to power the quartz. This mechanism was developed with the aim of creating a quartz watch that does not require battery replacement. This mechanism was adopted as Seiko's core movement and later renamed "A.G.S.". (Automatic Generating System). In 1991, to increase popularity, the watches were relaunched under the name "Seiko Kinetic".

=== Recent development ===
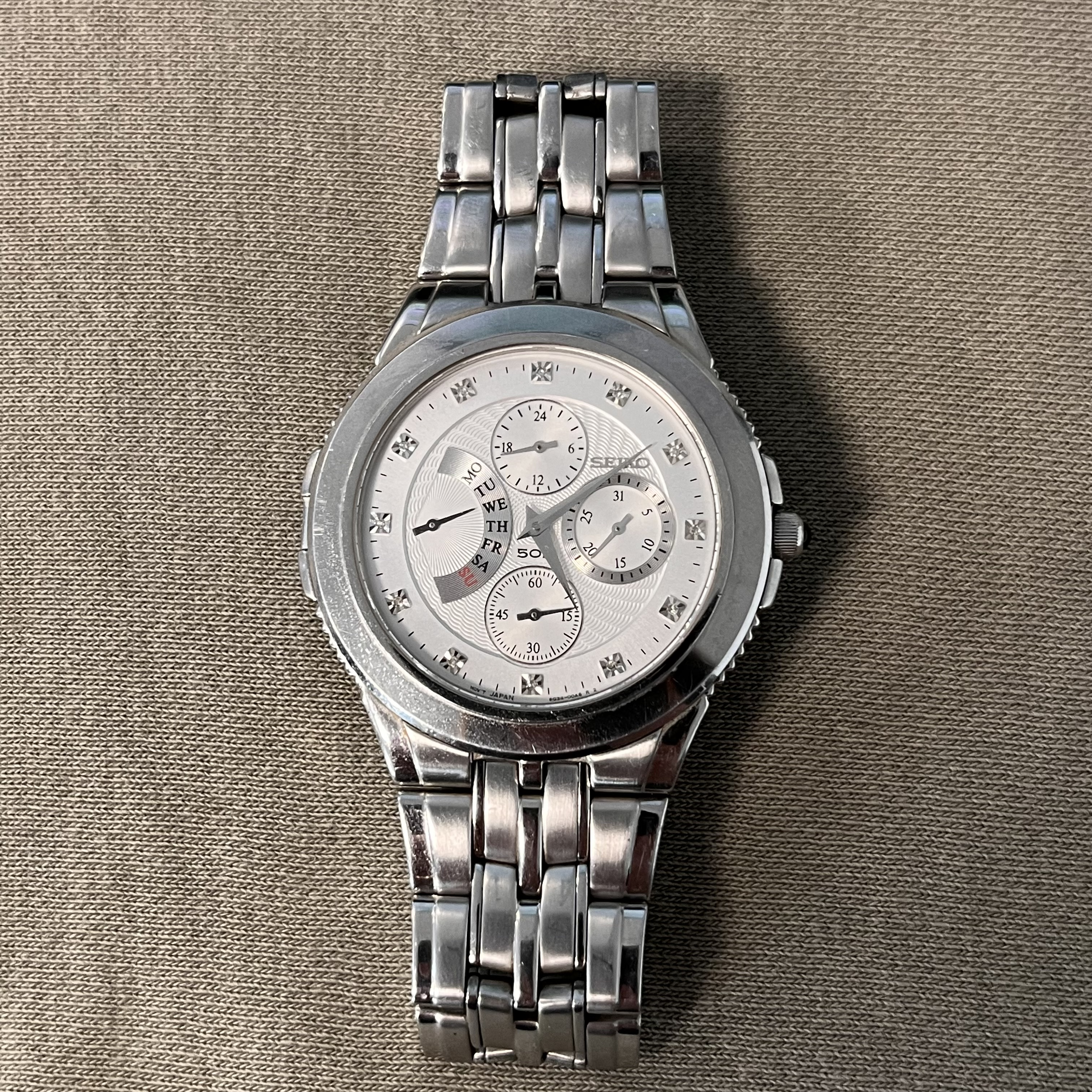
Seiko Le Grand

In 1998, Grand Seiko was released with the first new mechanical movement in 20 years.

In 1999, Seiko launched Spring Drive, the world's first mechanical wristwatch with the accuracy of quartz.

In 2004, the Astron, launched in 1969, was selected as an IEEE milestone. In the same year, Seiko began operating the Shizukuishi Watch Studio, which specializes in high-end watches.

In 2005, Seiko launched the world's first solar-powered analog watch that adjusts its accuracy by receiving three radio signals from Japan, Germany, and the United States.

In 2006, Seiko launched the world's first wristwatch based on microcapsule E-ink technology. This watch was the first Seiko watch to win an award at the Grand Prix de Genève for its innovative ability to bend the display part, in addition to providing more contrast and a wider viewing angle than conventional LCDs.

In 2010, Seiko launched the world's first solar radio-controlled digital watch based on the active matrix EPD system, advancing the expression of information in digital watches.

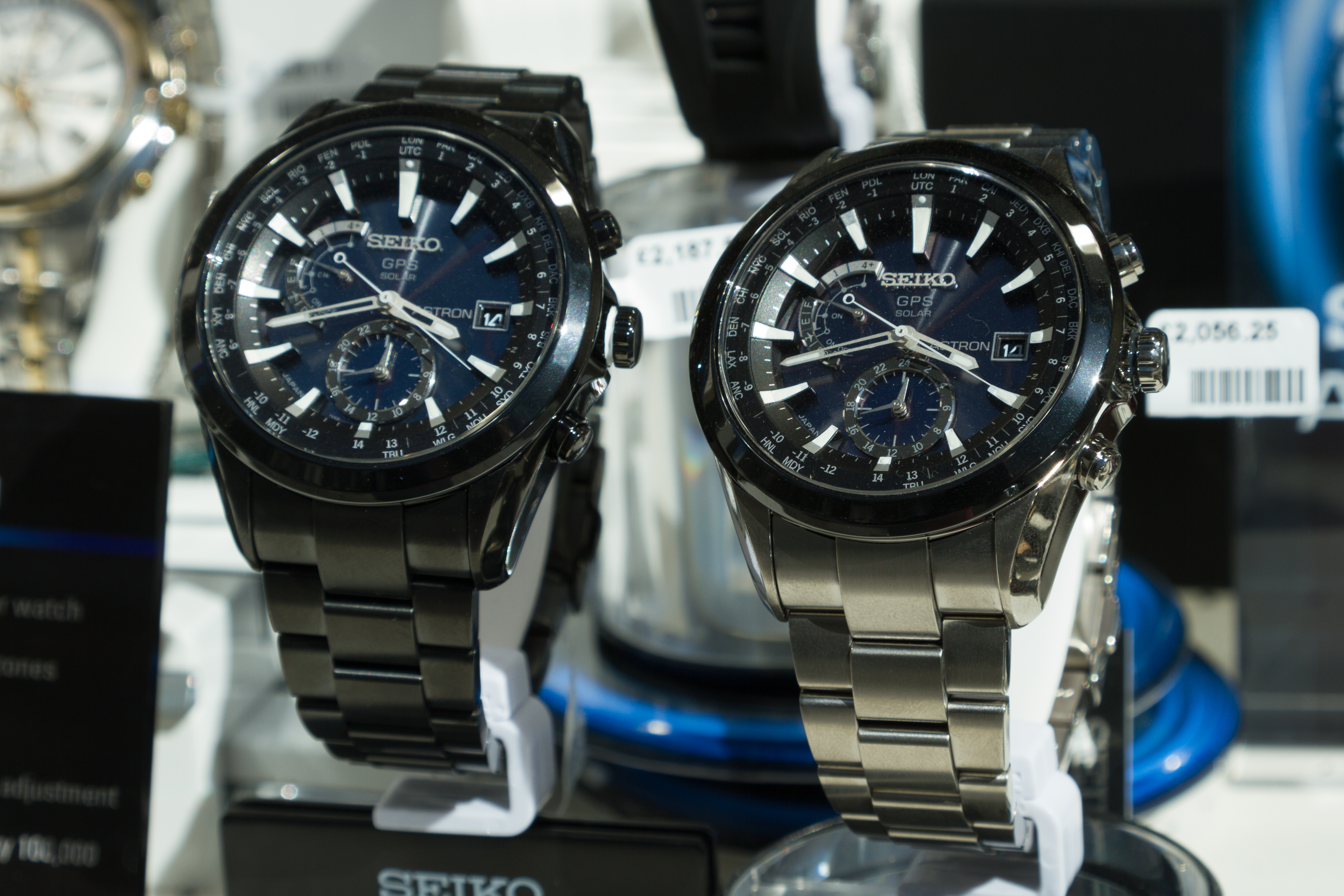
Astron GPS Solar

In 2012, Seiko launched the world's first GPS solar watch, the Seiko Astron GPS Solar. Seiko positioned this watch as the second revolutionary wristwatch after the Astron, which was launched in 1969, and described that it had the ultimate practical functionality, being able to instantly display extremely accurate time anywhere in the world and working as long as there is light. Seiko's low power consumption GPS receiver contributed to the practical application of this watch.

In April 2025, Seiko announced the Grand Seiko SLGB001 and SLGB003, the most accurate mainspring-driven watches in history. The Spring Drive Caliber 9RB2 dramatically improved the accuracy of mainspring-driven watches from the previous Spring Drive Caliber's record of ±15 seconds per month to ±20 seconds per year.

== Seiko Group ==
Hattori Tokeiten (K. Hattori & Co., currently Seiko Group Corporation) was one of the three principal companies of the former Seiko Group. The group was mainly composed of Hattori Tokeiten (K. Hattori), Daini Seikosha (currently Seiko Instruments Inc., SII), and Suwa Seikosha (currently Seiko Epson Corporation, Epson). Although they shared activities in the manufacturing and marketing of clocks and watches, the three companies were not formally affiliated as parent and subsidiary, nor as sibling companies under the Seiko Group; each was managed and operated independently, despite having some common shareholders, including key members of the Hattori family (posterity of Kintarō Hattori). Manufacturing was handled by three "Seikosha": Seikosha, the factory division of Hattori Tokeiten (K. Hattori), and two separate companies, Daini Seikosha and Suwa Seikosha. While there were no direct capital links among the three companies, they were connected through personal networks, centered around Hattori Tokeiten (K. Hattori), which managed sales.

=== Corporate evolution within the Seiko Group ===
In 1892, Kintarō Hattori established Seikosha in Ishiwara, Honjo Ward, Tokyo City (now Sumida, Tokyo), as the first factory of Hattori Tokeiten (K. Hattori & Co.), beginning with the production of wall clocks. The following year, the factory was relocated to Yanagishima, Honjo Ward, and in 1895 pocket watch production commenced, followed by wristwatch production in 1913. In 1917, Hattori Tokeiten (K. Hattori & Co.) was incorporated with a capital of five million yen, and its English name became K. Hattori & Co., Ltd.

After Hattori's death, the pocket watch and wristwatch manufacturing division was spun off from K. Hattori in 1937 to establish Daini Seikosha as an independent company, and in 1939 a new factory for Daini Seikosha was completed in Kameido (now Kōtō, Tokyo). This established a division of labor in which Seikosha manufactured clocks and Daini Seikosha manufactured watches.

In 1942, Hisao Yamazaki founded Daiwa Kogyo in Suwa, Nagano Prefecture, as a cooperative factory for Daini Seikosha, which produced and assembled watch components. In 1943, to avoid air raids by the U.S. military, Daini Seikosha established a wartime relocated factory near Daiwa Kogyo in Suwa. After the war, in 1959, Daini Seikosha's relocated factory was merged with Daiwa Kogyo to form Suwa Seikosha. In 1960, Suwa Seikosha developed the first Grand Seiko.

In 1961, Suwa Seikosha established a subsidiary, Shinshu Seiki, for the manufacture of watch components. Ahead of the 1964 Tokyo Olympics, Seikosha focused on the development of quartz technology for time measurement, while Suwa Seikosha concentrated on printer technology to output recorded times. This allowed Suwa Seikosha to establish its own research and development system, and from around 1968 it began producing and selling printers and electronic components. Suwa Seikosha developed the Astron, the world’s first commercial quartz watch. In 1985, Suwa Seikosha merged with Shinshu Seiki, which had been renamed Epson in 1982, to become Seiko Epson.

In 1970, Daini Seikosha established Morioka Seiko Kogyo (Morioka Seiko Instruments) in Shizukuishi, Iwate Prefecture, as a watch manufacturing factory, which began operations in 1971. In 1974, Ninohe Tokei Kogyo was founded in Ninohe, Iwate Prefecture, to supply parts for Morioka Seiko Instruments. In 1983, Daini Seikosha was renamed Seiko Denshi Kogyo (Seiko Instruments & Electronics Ltd). In 1996, Tono Seiki, a watch component manufacturer, became a subsidiary. With this addition, Seiko Denshi Kogyo established an integrated watch production system in Iwate Prefecture, centered on Morioka Seiko Instruments. The company was renamed Seiko Instruments Inc. (セイコーインスツルメンツ, Seiko Insutsurumentsu) in 1997. In 2004, its Japanese name was slightly modified to セイコーインスツル (Seiko Insutsuru), while the English name remained unchanged.

In 1970, Seikosha, which had remained as the factory division of K. Hattori, was spun off as a separate corporation. Seikosha ceased to exist in 1996 with the establishment of Seiko Clock and Seiko Precision.

In 1983, Hattori Tokeiten (K. Hattori) was renamed Hattori Seiko (Hattori Seiko Co., Ltd). In 1997, Hattori Seiko was renamed Seiko (Seiko Corporation). In 2001, Seiko Corporation became a holding company, and Seiko Watch Corporation was established to take over the watch business. In 2007, Seiko Corporation was renamed Seiko Holdings Corporation.

On January 26, 2009, Seiko Holdings and Seiko Instruments announced the two companies would merge on October 1, 2009, through a share swap. Seiko Instruments became a wholly owned subsidiary of Seiko Holdings as of 1 October 2009.

In 2020, the watch business of Seiko Instruments was transferred to Seiko Watch Corporation, a subsidiary of Seiko Holdings Corporation. Seiko Watch Corporation operates multiple subsidiaries engaged in the manufacture, maintenance and repair, and sales of watches. Its regional sales and distribution companies are organized separately for Seiko and Grand Seiko. For example, in the United States, Seiko Watch Corporation manages two subsidiaries: Grand Seiko Corporation of America and Seiko Watch of America LLC.

On October 1, 2022, Seiko Holdings Corporation was renamed Seiko Group Corporation.

Epson still develops and manufactures some of Seiko's highest-grade watches, but is managed and operated completely independently from Seiko Group. As of March 2025, Epson's revenue is more than four times greater than that of Seiko Group Corporation, and its number of employees is over six times larger. Epson fully acquired Orient Watch, originally founded in 1901, in 2009, and integrated its operations into Epson's business in 2017.

In October 2025, Tono Seiki and Ninohe Tokei Kogyo, subsidiaries of Morioka Seiko Instruments, were renamed Tono Seiko and Ninohe Seiko, respectively.

During the era of K. Hattori & Co., Ltd., the company's headquarters was located in Ginza 4-chome, at the site of the present-day Seiko House Ginza, from 1932. During the period it was known as Seiko Holdings Corporation, the headquarters was located in Toranomon until 2016, after which it moved to Ginza 1-chome. The headquarters has remained in Ginza 1-chome since the company was renamed Seiko Group Corporation.

=== Subsidiaries ===
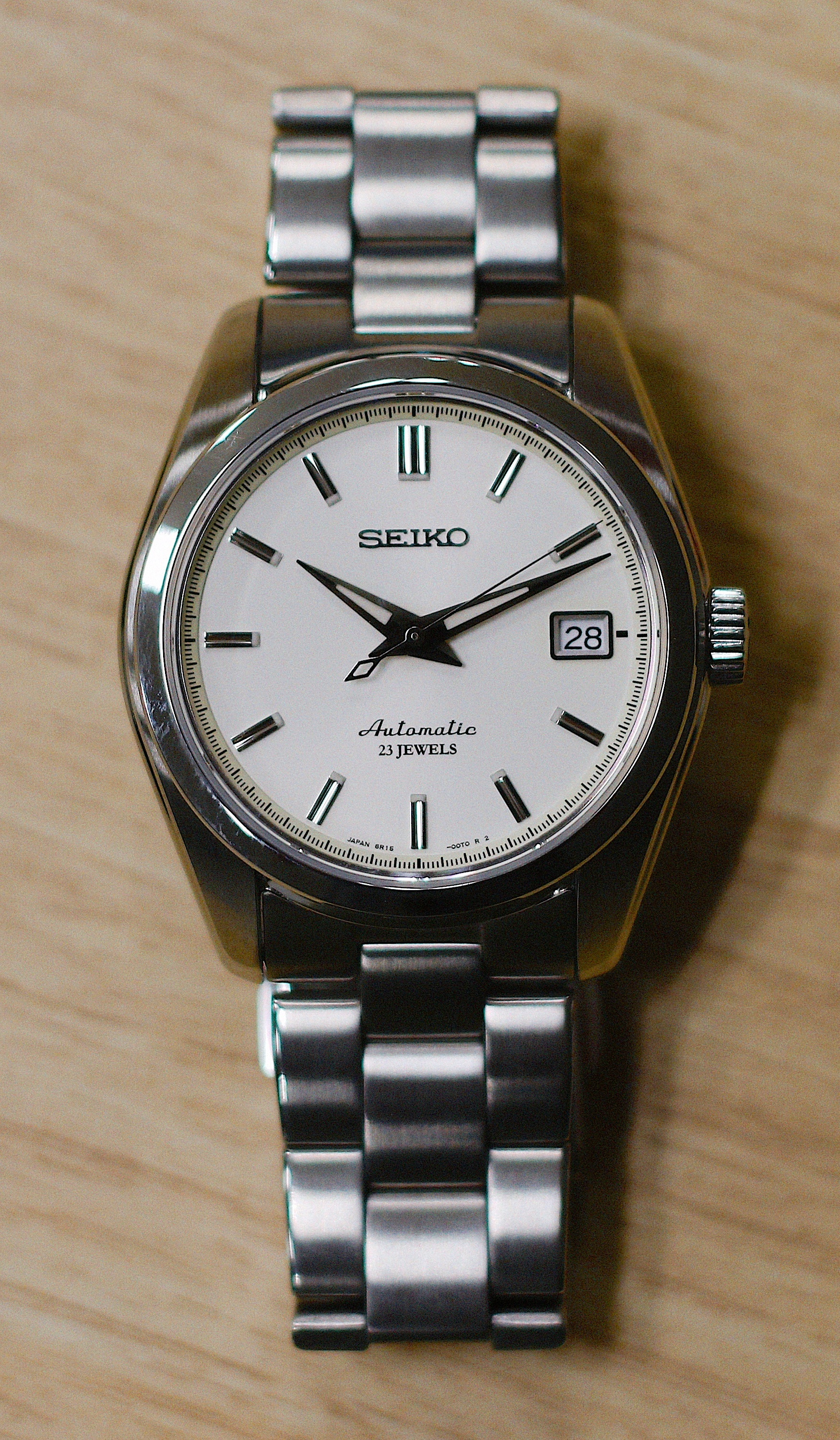
Seiko SARB035

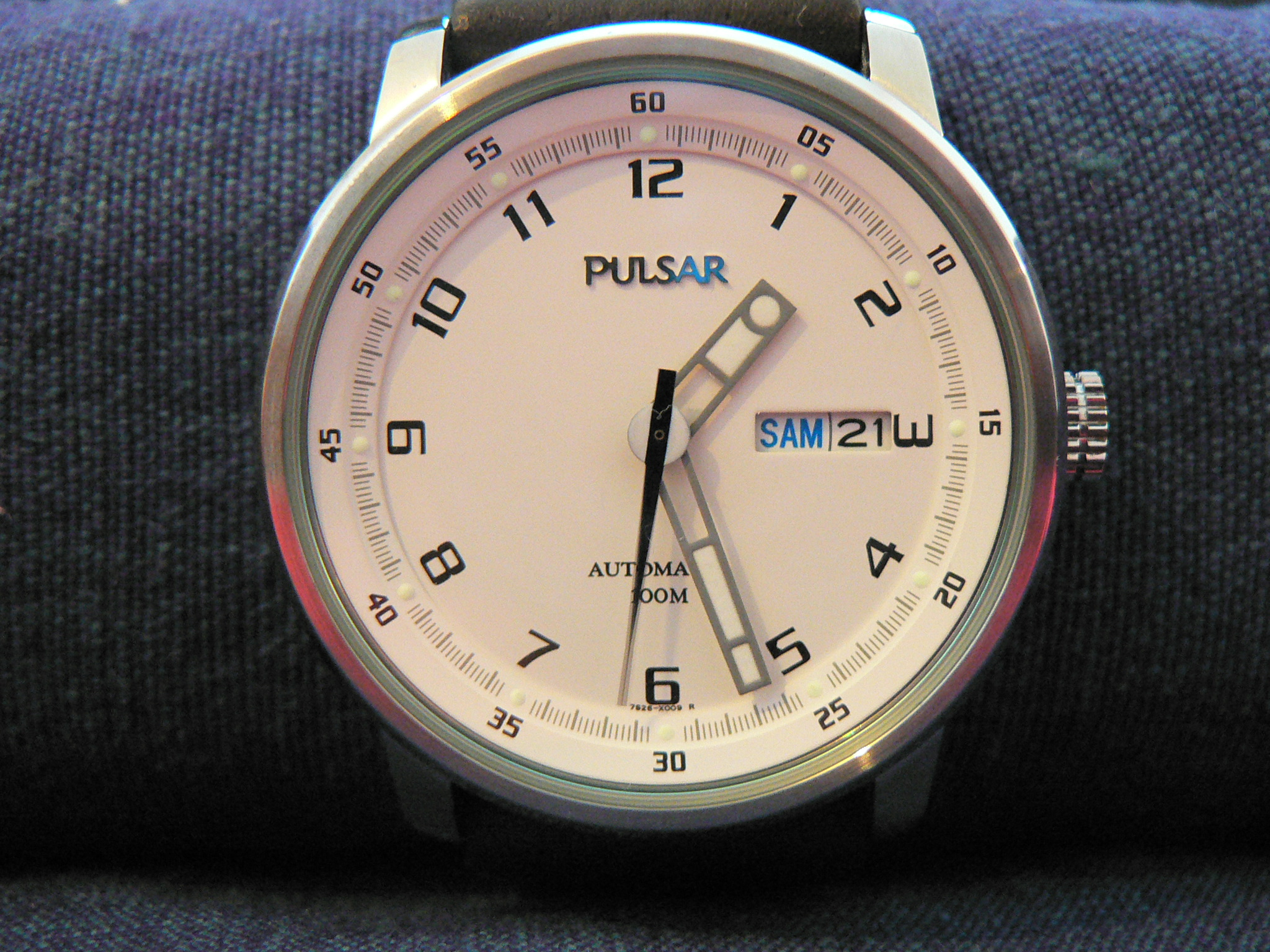
Pulsar Montre 4

- Seiko Watch Corporation — Planning, development and manufacturing of watches and other products and domestic and overseas sales. Product planning and sales of clocks—including wall clocks, desk clocks, and alarm clocks–for both domestic and international markets
- Seiko Instruments Inc. — Development, manufacturing and sales of electronic components, precision components and printing devices
- Seiko Solutions Inc. — Development, manufacturing, sales, maintenance, services and consultations for the hardware and the software relating with information systems and network services
- Seiko Time Creation Inc. — Development, manufacturing, and sales of facility clocks, sports timing systems, digital signage, and large-scale display boards, including related installation services and timekeeping support for sporting events
- Wako Co., Ltd. — Sales of watches, jewelry, accessories, interior supplies, art goods and crafts, glasses and foodstuffs
- Seiko NPC Corporation — Design, development, manufacturing, and sales of semiconductor products
- Seiko Future Creation Inc. — Group-wide R&D and production technology development, plus provision of FA systems and Provision of analytical instrumentation and microfabrication services

=== Manufacturing sites ===
Seiko watches and their components are manufactured in Japan and several other countries in Asia. In Japan, watches are produced at Morioka Seiko Instruments, Tono Seiko, and Ninohe Seiko in Iwate Prefecture, as well as at the Seiko Epson's Shiojiri facility in Nagano Prefecture. Morioka Seiko Instruments is a subsidiary of Seiko Watch Corporation, while Tono Seiko and Ninohe Seiko are subsidiaries of Morioka Seiko Instruments. Grand Seiko mechanical watches are made at Morioka Seiko Instruments' Grand Seiko Studio Shizukuishi, while quartz and Spring Drive watches are produced at the Shinshu Watch Studio within Epson's Shiojiri facility. The highest-end Grand Seiko Masterpiece Collection is produced in limited quantities: Spring Drive models at Epson's Micro Artist Studio in Shiojiri, and mechanical models at Atelier Ginza, located on the 7th floor of Seiko House Ginza in Tokyo. The Micro Artist Studio also manufactures Credor's high-complication watches. Additionally, Orient brand watches, owned by Epson, are manufactured at Epson's facility in Akita Prefecture.

Seiko has manufacturing facilities for watch parts and movements in Singapore, Malaysia, and China. In the late 1990s, the company transferred half of its movement production to a subsidiary in Singapore. Since the late 2010s, certain plastic component molding processes have been consolidated in China, while some metal processing operations have been consolidated in Malaysia. In 2020, these overseas manufacturing operations were reorganized as subsidiaries under Seiko Watch Corporation.

== Brands and product lines ==
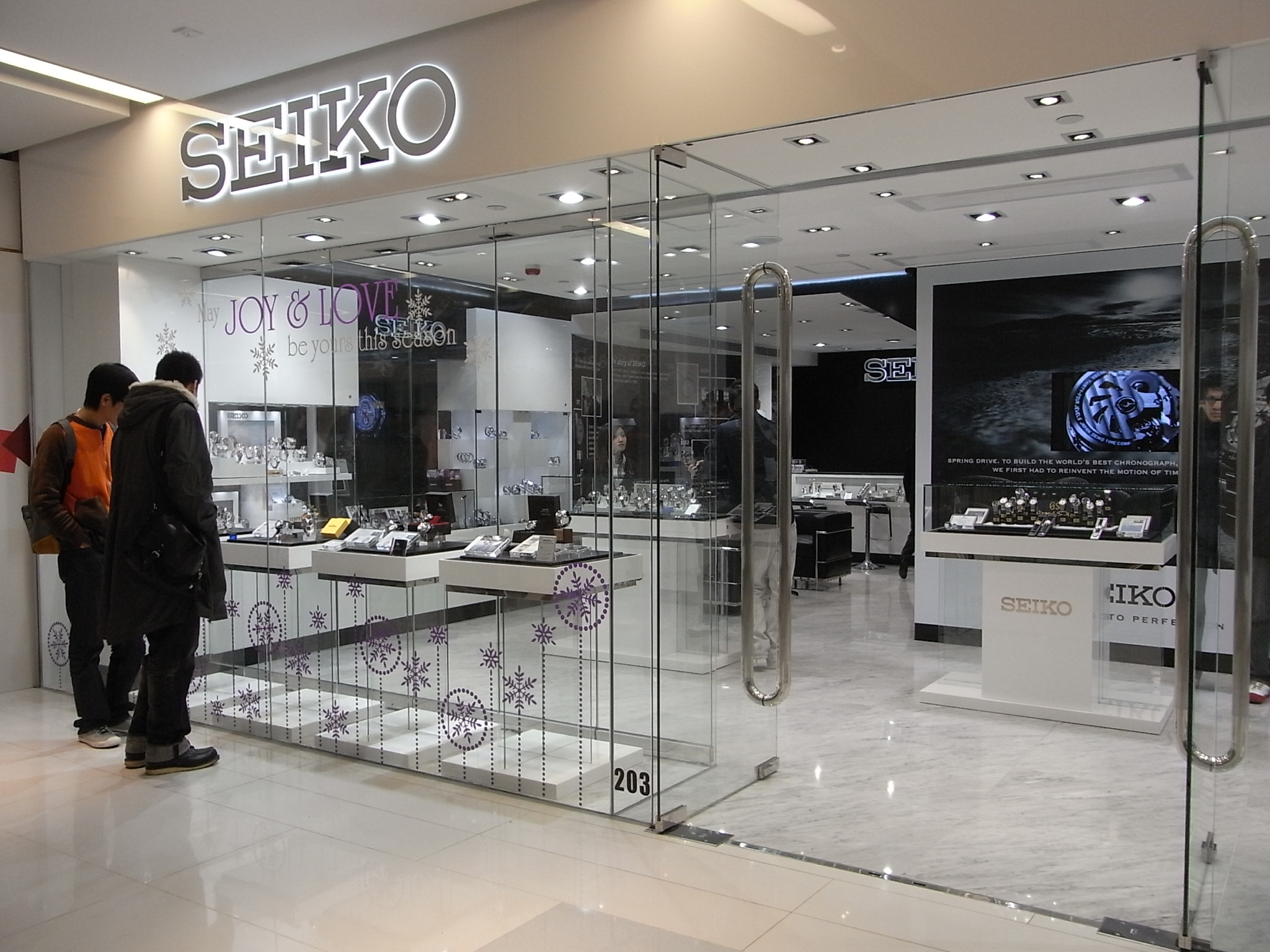
Seiko boutique in Hong Kong

Seiko produces watches with quartz, kinetic, solar, mechanical, and Spring Drive movements of varying prices, ranging from around ¥4,000 (US$45) to ¥50,000,000 (US$554,000). Seiko has created many brands in Japan and the international market including Lorus, Pulsar, and Alba.

In 2015, the Financial Times reported that the enthusiastic reception of the Spring Drive movement prompted Seiko to launch higher-end pieces. Harvard Business School reported: "In 2003, Shinji Hattori, a great-grandson of Seiko's founder, became Seiko Watch Company's president and CEO and felt that Seiko should raise its perceived image outside Japan. In management's view, Seiko could claim distinction as the only 'mechatronic manufacturer' in the world – a vertically integrated watchmaker that excelled in both mechanical watchmaking and micro-electronics."

In 2017 and 2019, Seiko separated its two highest-end brands, Grand Seiko and Credor, from its other brand lines, establishing them as independent brands with their own operations and distribution networks.

As of 2025, Seiko positions Grand Seiko, King Seiko, Seiko Prospex, Seiko Astron, Seiko Presage, and Seiko 5 Sports as global brands with worldwide distribution. In contrast, some brands such as Credor are marketed primarily in specific countries, such as Japan.

=== Seiko 5 ===
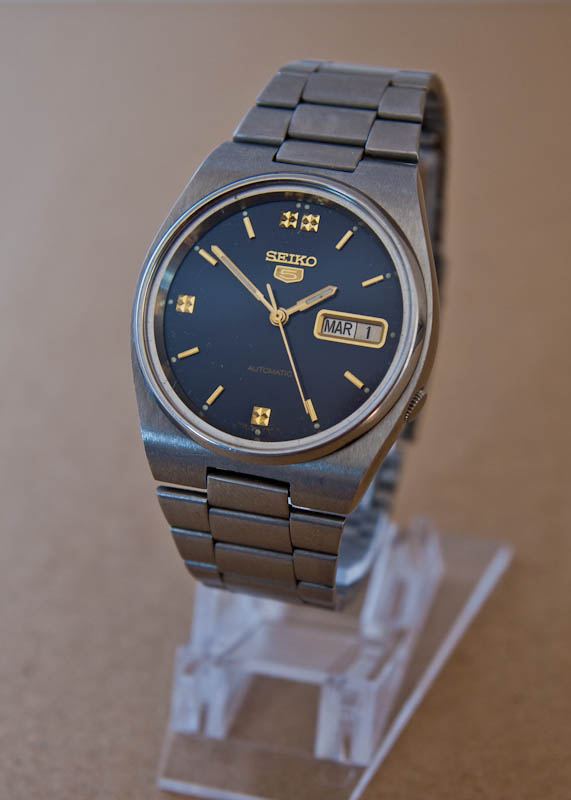
A Seiko 5 showcasing attributes of the sub brand, including a recessed crown at the 4 o'clock position and day-date complication

Seiko 5 is a sub brand that spawned with the introduction of the Seiko Sportsmatic 5 in 1963. Since then, many models have been introduced into the lineup, comprising a variety of styles.

The name of the Seiko 5 sub brand is a reference to five attributes that any watch belonging to it would typically exhibit:

1. An automatic watch movement
2. The day and the date displayed on the dial
3. Water resistance to an acceptable degree
4. A recessed crown at the 4 o'clock position
5. A durable case and bracelet

In spite of their association with the brand, not all of these characteristics are universal across the lineup, as certain models have omitted the Day-Date display (such as the SSA333) and/or the 4 o'clock positioning of the crown (such as the SRPG31K1 and the aforementioned SSA333).

Seiko released many models under the Seiko 5 sub brand, including large and small divers; watches featuring different strap options, such as leather, nylon, or steel; transparent, or sterile case-back versions; and many other variations.

=== Seiko Lord Matic ===
Seiko Lord Matic line of watches was introduced in 1968 and became popular in the 1970s. It featured design innovations such as faceted crystals, colorful dials and sporty bracelets.

=== Seiko Astron ===
The Seiko Astron series is a quartz watch which receives time information and location information from GPS satellites. These watches also have a solar panel which means that the battery does not need to be replaced.

=== Seiko Presage ===
The Seiko Presage series is an all-mechanical lineup, a step up from the entry-level Seiko 5 models. It has slightly more elaborate designs and complex movements, such as urushi-lacquer dials, and self-winding movements with power reserve indicators. The Presage watches are usually priced between US$200 and US$3,000.

Seiko entered a cooperation with the traditional cloisonné maker Ando Cloisonné Company from Nagoya to produce the dial for the limited edition in 2018.

=== Seiko Prospex ===
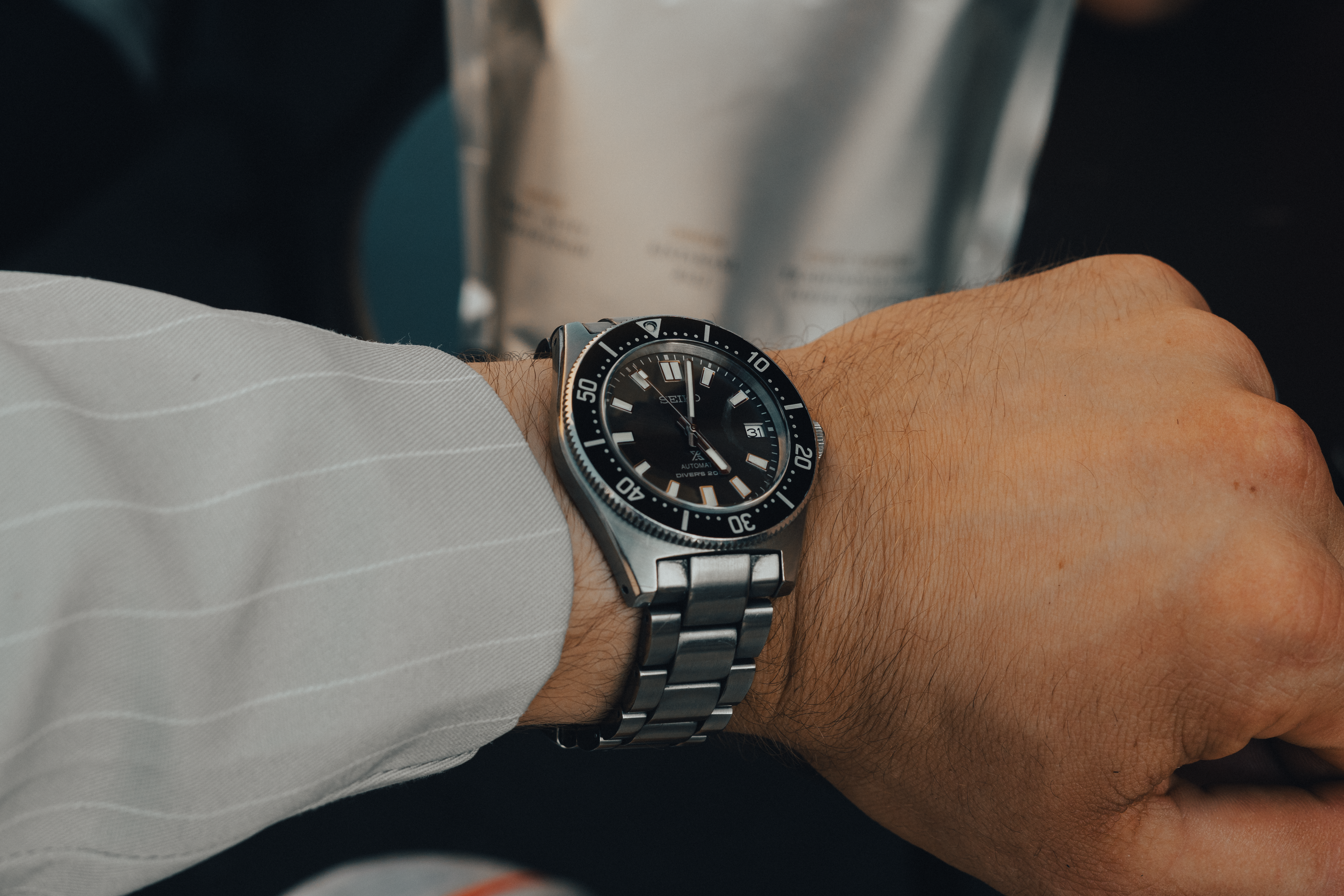
Seiko Prospex SPB143J

The Seiko Prospex series includes their professional series of watches such as their diving watches, which are typically ISO 6425 rated from 200 to 1000 metres of water resistance. Other watches in the Prospex line include field and pilot style watches.

In 2021, Akio Naito, President of the Seiko Watch Corporation, said that enthusiasts' respect for the brand can "influence the wider range of consumers." This influence can be seen in the Prospex range, where Seiko fans' nicknames resulted in the company eventually adopting these product names. For example, Seiko's own London boutique identifies the Prospex SPB191J1 watch using the fans' sobriquet: "Nicknamed 'Shogun' by fans, meaning Japanese 'Commander-in-chief', because of its strong looks."

In 2025, Seiko announced a boutique exclusive watch, Seiko Prospex 1968 Heritage Diver GMT. The latest “Seashadow” Black Boutique Edition (SPB534) is a 500-piece limited run, exclusive to select boutiques like Seiko Bond Street, London.

=== Grand Seiko ===
Prior to 1960, to challenge the status of Swiss watches and change the perception of Japanese watches, Daini Seikosha and Suwa began the discussion of a product line that could match the quality of Swiss watches under the suggestion of the parent company. At the time, Suwa Seikosha Co. was in charge of manufacturing men's watches, so it was decided that Suwa would produce the first Grand Seiko.

The first Grand Seiko, released in 1960, was based on Seiko's previous high-end watch, CROWN. This Grand Seiko has a 25-jewel, manual-winding, 3180 caliber, and its production was limited to 36,000 units. The watch was also the first chronometer-grade watch manufactured in Japan and was based on Seiko's own chronometer standard.

Some Grand Seiko timepieces also incorporate the company's Spring Drive movement, a movement that is a combination of both automatic and quartz timekeeping methods, leading to unparalleled accuracy in the world of automatic wristwatches. The most famous example is the SBGA011 Grand Seiko "Snowflake", housing the 9R Spring Drive movement.

Grand Seiko began expanding overseas in 2010. With the repositioning of Grand Seiko from a Seiko subbrand to an independent brand in 2017, Grand Seiko aimed to transition to a true luxury brand. The transition to an independent brand accelerated this expansion, and its overseas sales grew about fifteenfold between 2015 and 2025.

In 2022, Kodo Constant-Force Tourbillon SLGT 003, featuring the world's first combination tourbillon and constant-force mechanism on the same axis, was released, priced at 370,000 euros.

As of 2025, Grand Seiko is guided by the brand philosophy "The Nature of Time" and is composed of five collections: the Masterpiece Collection, Evolution 9 Collection, Elegance Collection, Heritage Collection, and Sport Collection. The Masterpiece Collection is produced in special workshops staffed by Seiko's most elite watchmakers. The mechanical models are crafted at Atelier Ginza, located on the 7th floor of Seiko House Ginza in Tokyo, while the Spring Drive models are manufactured at the Micro Artist Studio within Seiko Epson's facility in Shiojiri, Nagano. The Micro Artist Studio has also been responsible for creating Credor's complicated timepieces since 2000.

At Seiko House Ginza, customers can place custom orders for one-of-a-kind Grand Seiko timepieces, provided they meet certain conditions such as a high budget and the use of precious metals.

==== Design style ====
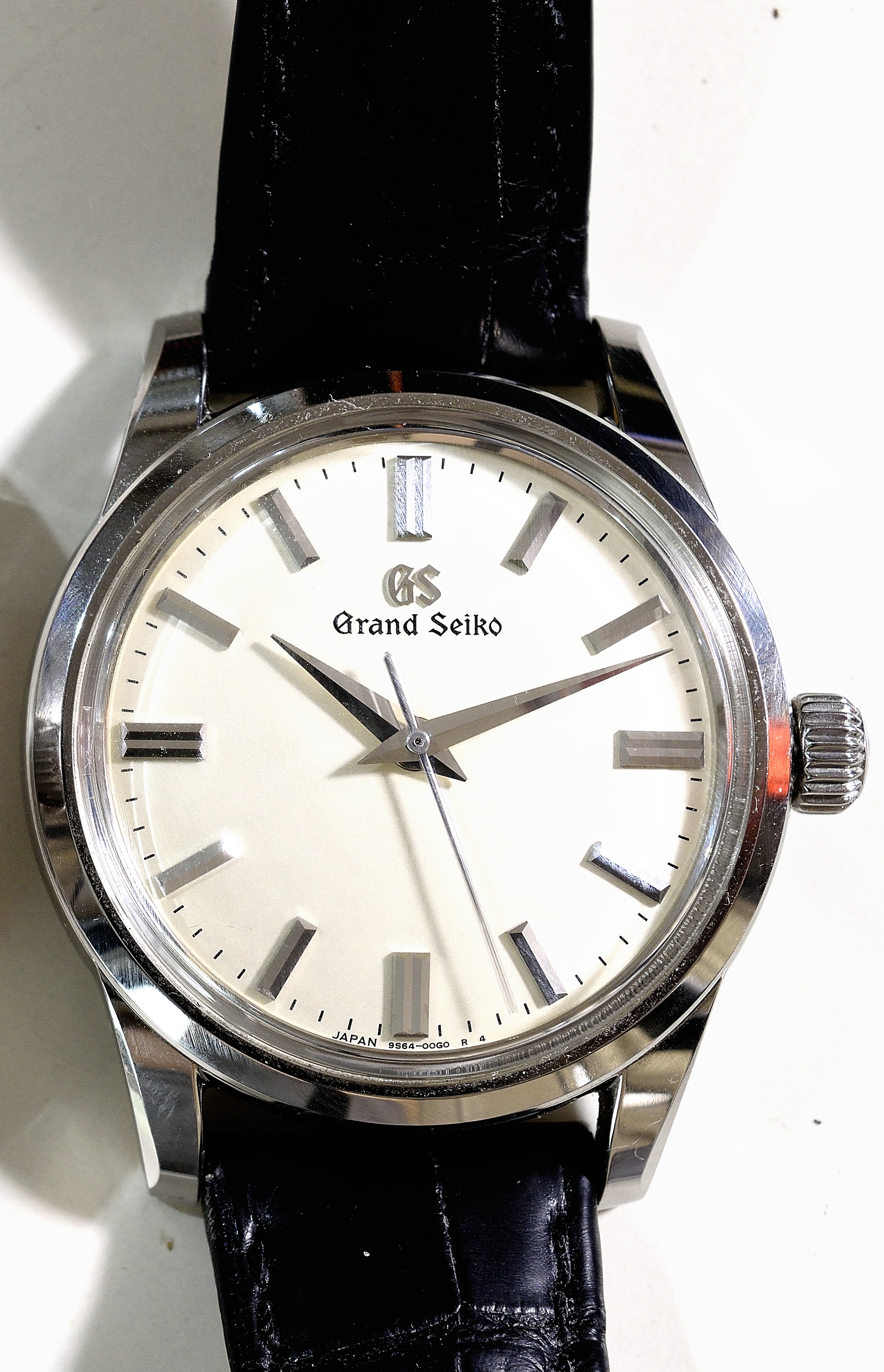
Grand Seiko SBGW231

The design language of the Grand Seiko was set in 1967, with the creation of Grand Seiko 44GS. The 44GS set the ground for all future Grand Seiko with nine elements. These elements help improve the legibility of the watch under different situations, and create a sharp, crisp visual impression:

1. Double width index at 12 o'clock
2. Multi-faceted rectangular markers
3. Highly polished bezel
4. Highly polished planes and two-dimensional surface
5. Half recessed crown
6. Flat dial
7. Multi-faceted hour and minute hands
8. Curved side line
9. Reverse slanted bezel wall and case side
10. Dress style with simple but beautiful design
11. Zaratsu polishing

=== King Seiko ===
The King Seiko line was created by Daini Seikosha to compete directly with Grand Seiko. The first King Seiko was released the year after the first Grand Seiko, in 1961. The first King Seikos were made with unmarked, manual winding, 25 jewel movements, that were not internally tested chronometers. This was followed by the release of the '44KS' movement in 1964, a remake of the 44GS, a manual winding, 18,000 bph, movement with a screwdown case back. In 1968, the 45KS was introduced with a manual winding, 36,000 bph hi-beat movement – again meant to compete with the 45GS but generally less accurate and with less finishing. King Seiko Certified Chronometer and Superior Certified Chronometers were released between 1968 and 1970. These first two were produced by Daini Seikosha but one of the most impressive King Seikos, the 56KS, was actually made by the Suwa Seikosha. The King Seiko 56KS movements were the same as those used in Grand Seiko’s 56GS series, Seiko Lord Matic watches, and Seiko chronometers. It was also introduced in 1968 and featured an automatic, 28,800 bph movement with 25 jewels and a 47-hour power reserve. These watches were all marked ‘Hi-Beat’ on the dial despite being only 28,800 bph (instead of 36,000). The 56KS was made until 1975, when the King Seiko line was discontinued by the company.

The last King Seiko collection was made by Daini, and was the 52KS, starting off in 1971 and made until 1975. This line used the 5245 and 5246 movement. These were meant to be high-end chronometers, with some even marked ‘V. F. A.’ (Very Fine Accuracy) or ‘Special’ on the dial. Many of these were of the "Vanac" sub-line and featured colorful dial faces and faceted crystals.

In 2021, Seiko released a reissue model inspired by the design of the second-generation King Seiko KSK, originally introduced in 1965, and in 2022, the company fully revived the King Seiko brand. In the summer of 2025, Seiko plans to bring back the 1972 King Seiko VANAC using modern technology. The watch will be powered by the Caliber 8L45, which offers an accuracy of +10 to -5 seconds per day and a power reserve of 72 hours. Seiko claims that this caliber represents the highest-grade mechanical movement within the Seiko brand (excluding calibers used in the independent Grand Seiko and Credor lines).

=== Credor ===
Credor is Seiko's highest-end brand alongside Grand Seiko. Seiko positions Grand Seiko as watches for everyday use, while Credor is intended for special occasions. The brand name is derived from the French words Crête d'Or, meaning "Crest (or Pinnacle) of Gold." Its logo symbolizes the peak of a mountain. As of 2026, the brand philosophy is "The Creativity of Artisans".

Credor was established in 1974 as a low-volume production line specializing in watches made with precious metals such as gold and platinum. In 2019, it was reorganized as an independent brand, like Grand Seiko, separate from Seiko's main lineup. As of 2022, Credor remains primarily a domestic (Japanese) brand with limited international distribution. Between 2021 and 2022, Seiko determined that Credor's product range and distribution network had become excessively broad and risked undermining its brand identity, and it subsequently revised its marketing with a more carefully selected lineup. In 2026, Credor exhibited at Watches and Wonders for the first time, marking its debut at an international trade fair as it seeks to expand its presence overseas. As of May 2026, there is a notable difference in the brand's lineup between Japan and international markets: the official Japanese website lists 77 models, whereas the English-language global website lists only 15. Credor depends more on hand craftsmanship than Grand Seiko, making it more difficult to increase production.

During Japan's economic bubble in the late 1980s and early 1990s, high-end jeweled watches priced over 10 million yen sold well, and Credor's jeweled watches experienced a golden era. In the mid-1980s, Credor's sales in the Japanese domestic market were approximately ten times those of Grand Seiko.

Since the 1990s, in addition to quartz jeweled watches, Seiko began incorporating mechanical watches into the Credor line, featuring intricate engravings based on traditional Japanese aesthetics. In 1996, the brand released its first skeleton watch, the GBBD998, which featured the ultra-thin 1.98 mm Caliber 6899 and a caliber engraved with motifs of swaying bamboo and chrysanthemums.

In 2000, Seiko established the Micro Artist Studio at Epson's facility in Shiojiri, Nagano, to begin producing haute horlogerie, which refers to high-end, artisanal Spring Drive watches, under the Credor name. Notable creations by the studio include the Credor Node Spring Drive Sonnerie (2006), Credor Node Eichi (2008), Credor Node Spring Drive Minute Repeater (2011), and Credor Eichi II (2014). Because Seiko had largely lost its capacity for high-end mechanical watchmaking by the late 1990s due to the quartz revolution, the release of the Spring Drive Sonnerie only six years after the studio's founding surprised many watch journalists.

Credor is also known for its artistic watches decorated with traditional Japanese lacquer techniques such as maki-e, raden, kirikane (gold leaf cutting), and zōgan (metal inlay). In 1987, Credor released its first pocket watch featuring lacquer decoration. In 2016, the brand launched the Fugaku Tourbillon, the first Seiko watch with a tourbillon, priced at 50 million yen, featuring a dial adorned with Hokusai's The Great Wave off Kanagawa rendered in engraving and lacquer art. In 2025, Credor released a new Goldfeather Tourbillon priced at 25.3 million yen, featuring a newly developed caliber that succeeds the one used in the Fugaku. The watch is adorned with engravings and urushi lacquer art depicting birds and feathers.

=== TimeTron ===
In the late 1990s, Seiko introduced, Seiko TimeTron, a line of digital watches with retrofuturistic design aimed at the young audience. It had an unconventional PC-inspired appearance, a dot-matrix display (and a button to change the size of the characters), was produced in a variety of colors for the case and the strap. Several models of TimeTron have been produced in limited numbers compared to other Seiko lines.

=== Other ===
Seiko produces electronic devices as well; during the 1980s, the company produced a notable range of digital synthesizers, such as the DS-202 and DS-250, for use in electronic music. Today the music division (part of Seiko Instruments Inc.) produces metronomes and tuning devices.

Seiko was previously engaged in the manufacturing and sale of jewelry, but exited the business in 2008. The company also sold its eyewear business to Hoya Corporation in 2014. However, eyewear products under the Seiko brand have continued to be sold by Hoya. In addition, Wako has continued to sell jewelry and eyewear from companies other than Seiko.

== Movements ==
=== Mechanical movement ===
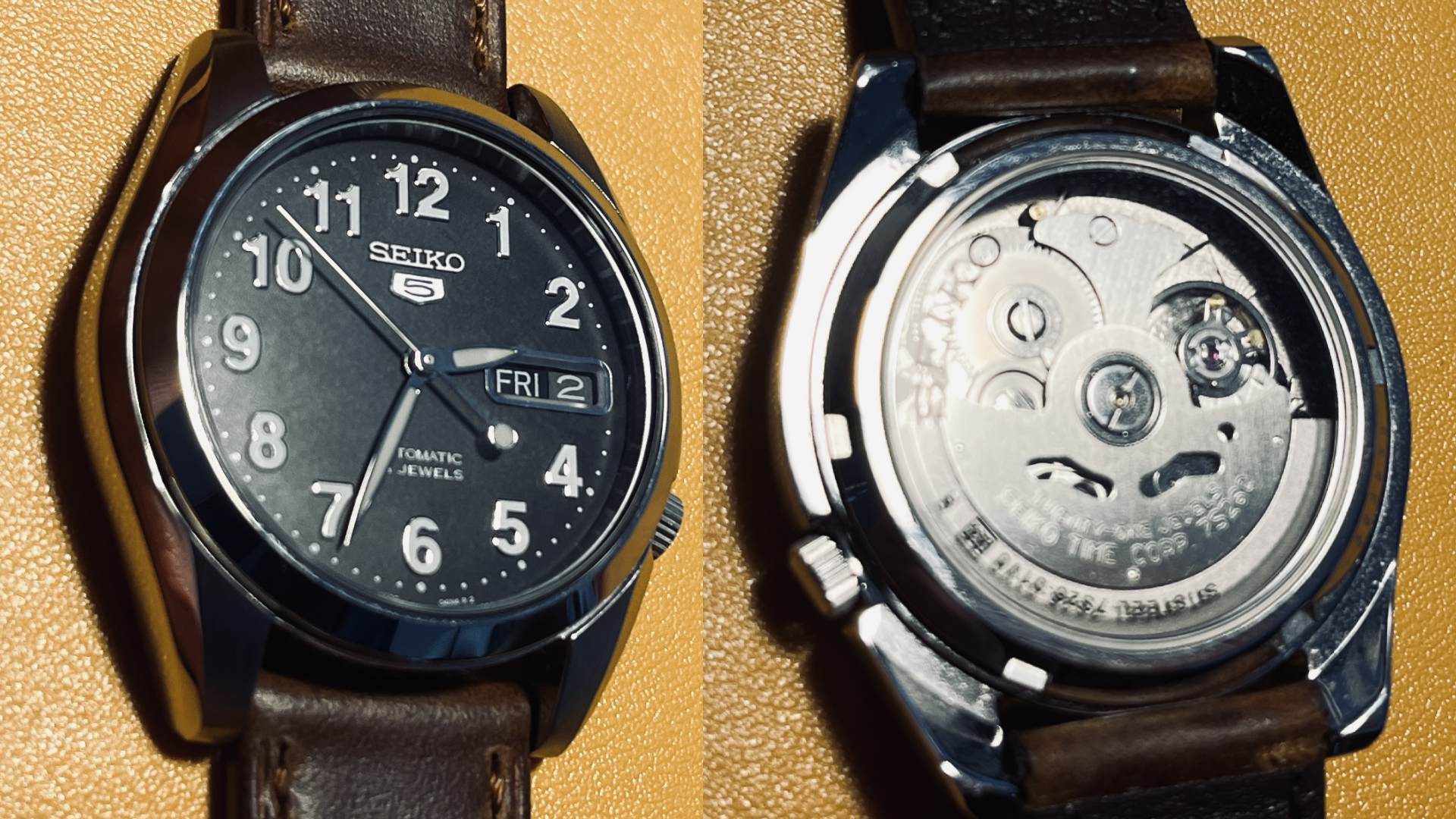
Seiko SNK381 with 7S26-01V0 movement

Seiko developed the Caliber 60, which at the time was the world’s thinnest center-seconds movement at 2.95 mm, and in 1960 released the Seiko Goldfeather, a slim dress watch housing this caliber. The origin of the still-ongoing Caliber 68 series lies in the Caliber 6800, which measured just 1.98 mm in thickness and was first used in the Seiko U.T.D., released in 1969. After a period of discontinuation, the 68 series was revived in the 1990s, and as of the 2020s, updated versions such as the Caliber 6890 continue to be produced for ultra-thin dress watches, including Credor's Goldfeather line.

In 1968, Seiko introduced three ten beat (ten ticks per second) calibers, the automatic caliber 61GS, the manual winding 45GS and 19GS for women's watch. The 61GS was Japan's first automatic ten beat watch, and it was the most accurate mechanical watch due to the high beat calibers. The calibers are considered high beat because normal mechanical movements beat six to eight times per second, and higher beat makes the watch more resistant to shock, thus achieving the high accuracy.

Seiko developed the Caliber 6139, featuring a Magic Lever, column wheel, and a groundbreaking vertical clutch mechanism, and in 1969 released the Seiko 5 Sports Speed Timer, the world’s first commercially available automatic chronograph. The vertical clutch system, used to transmit power for the start and stop functions of the stopwatch, had a significant impact on the subsequent development of chronographs worldwide.

In 2009, Seiko released the new ten beat caliber 9S85, which is a completely new design from the previous high beat caliber. The new caliber also met the Grand Seiko Standard, a chronometer certification that the company claims to be more strict than the Chronometer Certificate in Switzerland.

Seiko developed the Caliber 6830 and, in 2016, released the Credor Fugaku, its first watch featuring a tourbillon, priced at 50 million yen. The company later developed the Caliber 9ST1 and, in 2022, launched the Grand Seiko Kodo, the world's first timepiece to integrate both a tourbillon and a constant-force mechanism on a single axis, priced at 44 million yen. In 2025, Seiko announced the Caliber 6850 as the successor to the Caliber 6830, increasing the power reserve from 37 to 60 hours. The new movement was introduced in the Goldfeather Tourbillon, released under the Credor brand at a price of 25.3 million yen.

Seiko developed the innovative Dual Impulse Escapement and introduced it in 2020 with the Caliber 9SA5. This escapement is the second non-lever escapement to be produced on an industrial scale, following George Daniels' Co-Axial escapement, which is used in Omega watches. It provides both a long power reserve and strong resistance to external disturbances that may affect timekeeping accuracy.

List of selected Seiko mechanical watch calibers

Caliber	Vibrations (per hour)	Jewels	Accuracy (sec)	Power reserve (hour)	Features
2R05	21,600	21	+45～-35	40	3 hands, time display (Hour, minute and second hands) and date display
4R34	21,600	24	+45～-35	40	4 hands, time display (Hour, minute and second hands, 24-hour hand) and date display
4R35	21,600	24	+45～-35	40	3 hands, time display (Hour, minute and second hands) and date display
4R36	21,600	24	+45～-35	40	3 hands, time display (Hour, minute and second hands) and day and date display
4R39	21,600	24	+45～-35	41	3 hands, time display (Hour, minute and second hands), 24-hour hand
4R57	21,600	29	+40～-20	40	5 hands, time display (Hour, minute and second hands), date display, power reserve indicator
4R72	21,600	24	+45～-35	41	3 hands, time display (Hour, minute and second hands)
6850	21,600	22	+15～-10	60	2 hands, time display (Hour and minute hands)
6890	21,600	22	+25～-15	37	2 hands, time display (Hour and minute hands)
6899	21,600	26	+25～-15	37	2 hands, time display (Hour and minute hands)
6L35	28,800	26	+15～-10	45	3 hands, time display (Hour, minute and second hands) and date display
6L37	28,800	26	+15～-10	45	3 hands, time display (Hour, minute and second hands) and date display
6R15	21,600	23	+25～-15	50	3 hands, time display (Hour, minute and second hands) and date display
6R20	28,800	29	+25～-15	45	6 hands, time display (Hour, minute and second hands), day and date display, power reserve indicator
6R21	28,800	29	+25～-15	45	6 hands, time display (Hour, minute and second hands), day and date display, power reserve indicator
6R24	28,800	31	+25～-15	45	6 hands, time display (Hour, minute and second hands), day and date display, power reserve indicator
6R27	28,800	29	+25～-15	45	5 hands, time display (Hour, minute and second hands), date display, power reserve indicator
6R31	21,600	24	+25～-15	70	3 hands, time display (Hour, minute and second hands)
6R35	21,600	24	+25～-15	70	3 hands, time display (Hour, minute and second hands) and date display
6R51	21,600	24	+25～-15	72	3 hands, time display (Hour, minute and second hands)
6R54	21,600	24	+25～-15	72	4 hands, time display (Hour, minute and second hands), 24-hour hand and date display
6R55	21,600	24	+25～-15	72	3 hands, time display (Hour, minute and second hands) and date display
6R5H	21,600	24	+25～-15	72	3 hands, time display (Hour, minute and second hands), 24-hour hand
6R5J	21,600	24	+25～-15	72	3 hands, time display (Hour, minute and second hands), 24-hour hand
6R64	28,800	29	+25～-15	45	6 hands, time display (Hour, minute and second hands), date hand, power reserve indicator and 24-hour hand
7S26	21,600	21	+40～-20	41	3 hands, time display (Hour, minute and second hands) and day and date display
7S36	21,600	23	+40～-20	41	3 hands, time display (Hour, minute and second hands) and day and date display
8L35	28,800	26	+15～-10	50	3 hands, time display (Hour, minute and second hands) and date display
8L45	28,800	35	+10～-5	72	3 hands, time display (Hour, minute and second hands) and date display
8L55	36,000	37	+15～-10	55	3 hands, time display (Hour, minute and second hands) and date display
8R28	28,800	34	+25～-15	45	6 hands, time display (Hour, minute and small second hands), stopwatch display (Hour, minute and second hands) and date display
9S27	28,800	35	+8～-3	50	3 hands, time display (Hour, minute and second hands) and date display
9S63	28,800	33	+5～-3	72	4 hands, time display (Hour, minute and small second hands) and power reserve indicator
9S64	28,800	24	+5～-3	72	3 hands, time display (Hour, minute and second hands)
9S65	28,800	35	+5～-3	72	3 hands, time display (Hour, minute and second hands) and date display
9S66	28,800	35	+5～-3	72	4 hands, time display (Hour, minute and second hands, 24-hour hand) and date display
9S68	28,800	35	+5～-3	72	3 hands, time display (Hour, minute and second hands), and date display
9S85	36,000	37	+5～-3	55	3 hands, time display (Hour, minute and second hands), and date display
9S86	36,000	37	+5～-3	55	4 hands, time display (Hour, minute and second hands, 24-hour hand) and date display
9SA4	36,000	47	+5～-3	80	3 hands, time display (Hour, minute and second hands)
9SA5	36,000	47	+5～-3	80	3 hands, time display (Hour, minute and second hands) and date display
9SC5	36,000	60	+5～-3	72	6 hands, time display (Hour, minute and small second hands), stopwatch display (Hour, minute and second hands) and date display
9ST1	28,800	44	+5～-3	72	3 hands, time display (Hour and minute hands) and power reserve indicator

=== Quartz movement ===
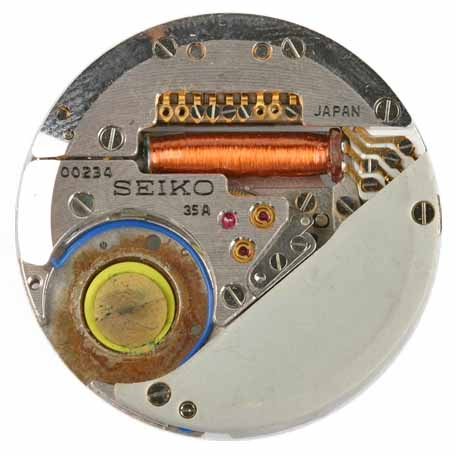
Quartz Movement of the Seiko Astron, 1969 (Deutsches Uhrenmuseum, Inv. Inv. 2010-006)

On 25 December 1969, Seiko released the world's first quartz watch, the Seiko Quartz ASTRON, marking the beginning of the quartz revolution. The watch used a crystal oscillator for accuracy, where the crystal generates steady vibration when voltage is applied to it. During the ten years of development at Suwa Seikosha, Seiko managed to create many parts which enabled the viable application of quartz in wristwatches. For example, Seiko cut the crystal oscillator into the shape of a tuning-fork, and developed an integrated circuit and step motor to operate with the signals from the crystal oscillator. Although creating the parts that enabled quartz watches, Seiko did not monopolize the patent rights for the unique pieces, but decided to open them.

In 1973, Seiko announced the world's first LCD quartz watch with six-digit digital display.

In 1975, Seiko launched the world's first multi-function digital watch, the 0634.

In 1978, Seiko released the Twin Quartz watch to address the effect of temperature on the frequency of the quartz crystal oscillator, which put a limitation on the accuracy of quartz watches. Seiko put a second crystal in the watch that is linked with a processor that detects the change in temperature and signals the main oscillator to compensate. The result was a huge improvement in the watch's accuracy from five seconds per month to five seconds per year.

Kinetic watches were introduced by Seiko in 1986 at the Basel Fair Trade Show. These quartz watches use the motion of the wearer's wrist to charge their battery.

=== Grand Seiko 9F quartz movement ===
The 9F quartz movement is used in Grand Seiko quartz watches.

The Grand Seiko's 9F quartz movement is assembled entirely by hand by two expert craftsmen.

Features include:

- Backlash auto-adjust mechanism
- Twin pulse control motor
- Instant date change mechanism – it can change the date display in 1/2000th of a second
- Accuracy within +-10 seconds per year

=== Spring Drive ===
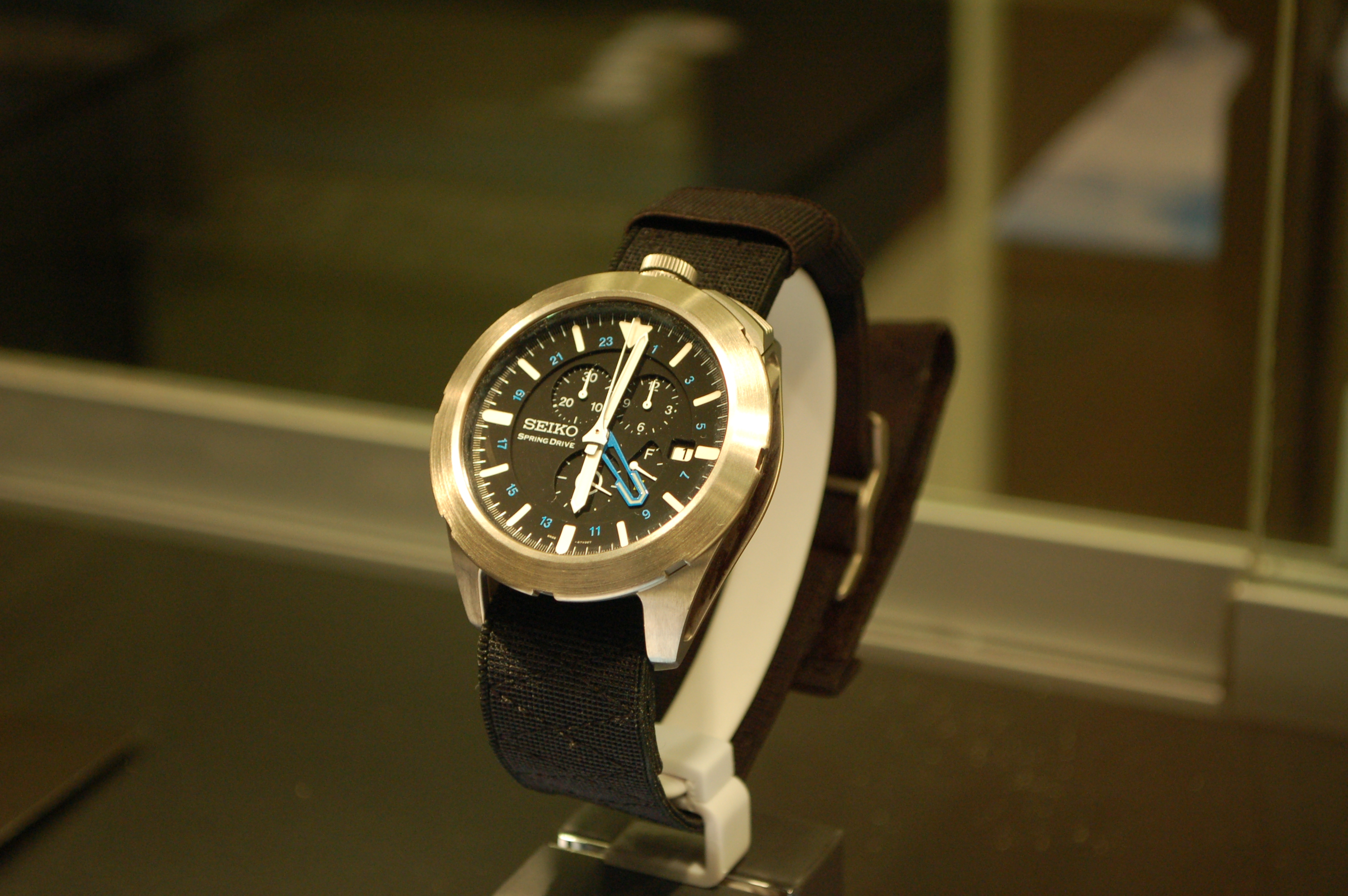
The Seiko Spacewalk is a limited edition Spring Drive model, designed specifically for use in space.

The Spring Drive was announced in 1997, developed by Yoshikazu Akahane and his team, and inspired by Yoshikazu's vision: "a watch wound by a mainspring and with one-second-a-day accuracy, a precision that only the finest electronic watches could deliver." The movement achieved high accuracy with one second per day, long power reserve (72 hours) with its unique developed alloy, fast winding with the "Magic Lever" design and glide-motion movement with the watch hands.

Spring Drive combines a precision-regulating mechanism that uses a quartz crystal oscillator with a mainspring-driven mechanical watch, making it far more accurate than traditional mechanical watches. As of 2025, the Caliber 9RB2 has achieved an impressive accuracy of ±20 seconds per year. Spring Drive calibers are often superior not only in accuracy but also in power reserve compared to mechanical movements. The Caliber 9R01 offers a power reserve of 192 hours (eight days), while the 9RA2 and 9RA5 provide 120 hours (five days), and the 9R02 delivers 84 hours. These significantly exceed the 80-hour power reserve of Grand Seiko's longest-running mechanical movements, the 9SA4 and 9SA5.

The movement uses a mainspring as a source of energy and transmits it through a gear train, just like a traditional mechanical watch, but instead of an escapement and balance wheel, Seiko used the newly developed "Tri-synchro regulator", which acts like a quartz movement. The Tri-synchro regulator has three main functions: controlling the mechanical energy of the mainspring, generate electricity for the low consumption (~25 nanowatts) quartz crystal oscillator and generate a magnetic force to regulate the glide wheel. By replacing the traditional escapement with a magnetic brake, the Spring Drive operates with lower noise and presents a glide motion hand that shows the continuous flow of time. The Spring Drive movement was also used as the basis for the first-ever watch designed to be worn by an astronaut during a space walk, the aptly named Seiko Spring Drive Spacewalk.

== Sponsorships ==
Seiko previously sponsored Honda F1 (formerly known as BAR [British American Racing] Honda). The Honda team driver, Jenson Button, was the brand ambassador of Seiko. The company name appeared on the team's clothing, Button's helmet, and on the pitstop lollipops. The sponsorship lasted until the end of the 2008 season, when Honda discontinued participating in F1 racing.

Seiko was an official sponsor of FC Barcelona from 2011 to 2014.

Seiko was the official timekeeper of the North American Soccer League during the 2014 season.

On January 10, 2014, on the eve of the Australian Open in Melbourne, Shinji Hattori, President of Seiko Watch Corporation, presented to Novak Djokovic a Seiko Astron GPS Solar limited edition worth $1700. It was launched worldwide with a million units, symbolizing Seiko's partnership with the world's no.1 professional tennis player.

Since 2014, Seiko has been a sponsor of the Australian motorsport team Team 18, and serves as the primary sponsor of the No. 20 Holden ZB Commodore driven by Scott Pye in the 2022 Supercars Championship.

Seiko developed a digital watch styled after Venom Snake's timepiece in Metal Gear Solid V: The Phantom Pain under its Wired brand. It was launched on September 2, 2015, with the Metal Gear installment. It was limited to 2,500 pieces worldwide and was sold out via pre-orders within 5 minutes of launch. The box of the watch was designed by Metal Gear Solid artist Yoji Shinkawa. Seiko is also named as the official timekeeper of the Gran Turismo racing game series, published by Sony Computer Entertainment.

Shohei Ohtani has served as a brand ambassador for Seiko in the Japanese market since 2016, and became a global ambassador in 2026. In Japan, various Grand Seiko models he wore at press conferences and formal events attracted considerable attention, while several Prospex models he wore in television commercials became so popular that they were frequently out of stock, despite being regular production items. Seiko has also released a number of limited-edition models associated with Ohtani. In July 2026, to commemorate the 10th anniversary of his appointment as a brand ambassador, Seiko presented him with the one-of-a-kind mechanical watch Seiko Star Time, which uses five stacked display discs to provide a cumulative time display of up to one million hours (114 years).

=== Official timekeeper ===
Seiko has been the official timekeeper of many major sporting events:

==== Olympic Games ====
- 1964 Summer Olympics in Tokyo, Japan
- 1972 Winter Olympics in Sapporo, Japan
- 1992 Summer Olympics in Barcelona, Spain
- 1994 Winter Olympics in Lillehammer, Norway
- 1998 Winter Olympics in Nagano, Japan
- 2002 Winter Olympics in Salt Lake City, Utah, United States

==== FIFA World Cup ====
- 1978 FIFA World Cup in Argentina
- 1982 FIFA World Cup in Spain
- 1986 FIFA World Cup in Mexico
- 1990 FIFA World Cup in Italy

Seiko also released official products for the 2002 FIFA World Cup held in Japan and South Korea, without being the official timekeeper.

==== IAAF World Championships ====
Currently, Seiko has an agreement with World Athletics to act as the timekeeper for the latest editions of the World Athletics Championships. The agreement started in 1985 and is set to continue until at least 2029.

- 1987 World Championships in Athletics in Rome, Italy
- 1991 World Championships in Athletics in Tokyo, Japan
- 1993 World Championships in Athletics in Stuttgart, Germany
- 1995 World Championships in Athletics in Gothenburg, Sweden
- 1997 World Championships in Athletics in Athens, Greece
- 1999 World Championships in Athletics in Seville, Spain
- 2001 World Championships in Athletics in Edmonton, Canada
- 2003 World Championships in Athletics in Paris, France
- 2005 World Championships in Athletics in Helsinki, Finland
- 2007 World Championships in Athletics in Osaka, Japan
- 2009 World Championships in Athletics in Berlin, Germany
- 2011 World Championships in Athletics in Daegu, South Korea
- 2013 World Championships in Athletics in Moscow, Russia
- 2015 World Championships in Athletics in Beijing, China
- 2017 World Championships in Athletics in London, United Kingdom
- 2019 World Championships in Athletics in Doha, Qatar
- 2022 World Athletics Championships in Eugene, United States
- 2023 World Athletics Championships in Budapest, Hungary
- 2025 World Athletics Championships in Tokyo, Japan

==== Tennis tournaments ====
During its history, Seiko has been the official timekeeper for many tennis tournaments.

- Seiko Super Tennis in Tokyo, Japan (1978–1995)
- French Open in Paris, France (1980–1991)
- Pan Pacific Open in Tokyo and later in Osaka, Japan (1984–present)
