= Kintarō Hattori =

Japanese watchmaker (1860–1934)

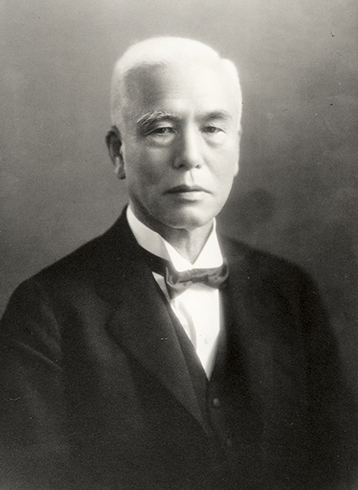
- Born: November 21, 1860; Kyōbashi, Tokyo, Edo Period Japan
- Died: March 1, 1934 (aged 73); Tokyo, Empire of Japan
- Occupations: Watchmaker, businessman
- Known for: Founder of Seiko

Kintarō Hattori (服部 金太郎, November 21, 1860 – March 1, 1934) was a Japanese businessman and one of the first and most important Japanese watchmakers in history, as well as the founder of Seiko, one of the world's largest manufacturers of watches. He was a permanent council member of the Japanese Red Cross.

== Early life ==
Kintarō Hattori was born in Uneme-cho, Kyōbashi, Tokyo, on November 21, 1860, to a well-established family of merchants.

At age thirteen, he was initiated in commercial and technical training and was engaged the following year by Kobayashi Denjiro, one of the main watch and clock traders in Japan, where he began his first internship at the Kameda Clock Shop. In 1877, he opened 'Hattori Clock Repair Shop' (服部時計修繕所, Hattori Tokei Shūzensho) in the Ginza area.

== Career ==
In 1881, Hattori established his first business "K. Hattori & Co." (服部時計店, Hattori Tokeiten), opening his own watchmaking shop. At 25 years old, K. Hattori initiated trade with the Swiss firms based in Yokohama, focusing on wholesaling and retailing of imported Swiss timepieces. After almost two decades of retailing Swiss watches from foreign firms, Hattori decided to manufacture his own watches locally, establishing a watchmaking factory in Tokyo called "Seikosha" (精工舎, Seikōsha).

Following the great success of his first Japanese manufactured timepieces, he traveled to Europe to inspect and purchase machinery tools to keep up with western technology and productivity. With great success, Hattori returned to Japan with new watchmaking equipment and several new production lines were born as a consequence. At age 35, he launched a line of pocket watches called the "Timekeeper" and just a few years later released his first line of alarm clocks, in 1899. By 1905, Hattori had expanded his trading operations all over Japan as well as Shanghai and Hong Kong, and becoming the largest watch and clock dealer in Japan. In 1913, when Hattori was 53 years old, Seikosha manufactured and introduced the first Japanese wristwatch: the "Laurel."

In 1917, K. Hattori & Co. was converted to a joint-stock corporation "K. Hattori & Co., Ltd." (株式会社服部時計店, Kabushiki-gaisha Hattori Tokeiten) (currently Seiko Group Corporation). In 1924, the "Seiko" brand was launched. His company later revolutionized watchmaking with the introduction of the first quartz movement, becoming one of the world's largest watch manufacturers. Hattori died on 1934, aged 73, in Tokyo, Japan.

== Legacy ==
Kintarō Hattori was one of the key figures in establishing the watchmaking industry in Japan. His career accomplishments include founding the first watchmaking factory in Japan named "Seikosha", in 1892. Kintarō Hattori also founded the watch and jewelry shop K. Hattori (Hattori Tokeiten in Japanese) in the Ginza area of Tokyo, Japan, currently named Seiko Group Corporation and globally known as Seiko.
