= Alba (watch) =

Watch brand by Seiko

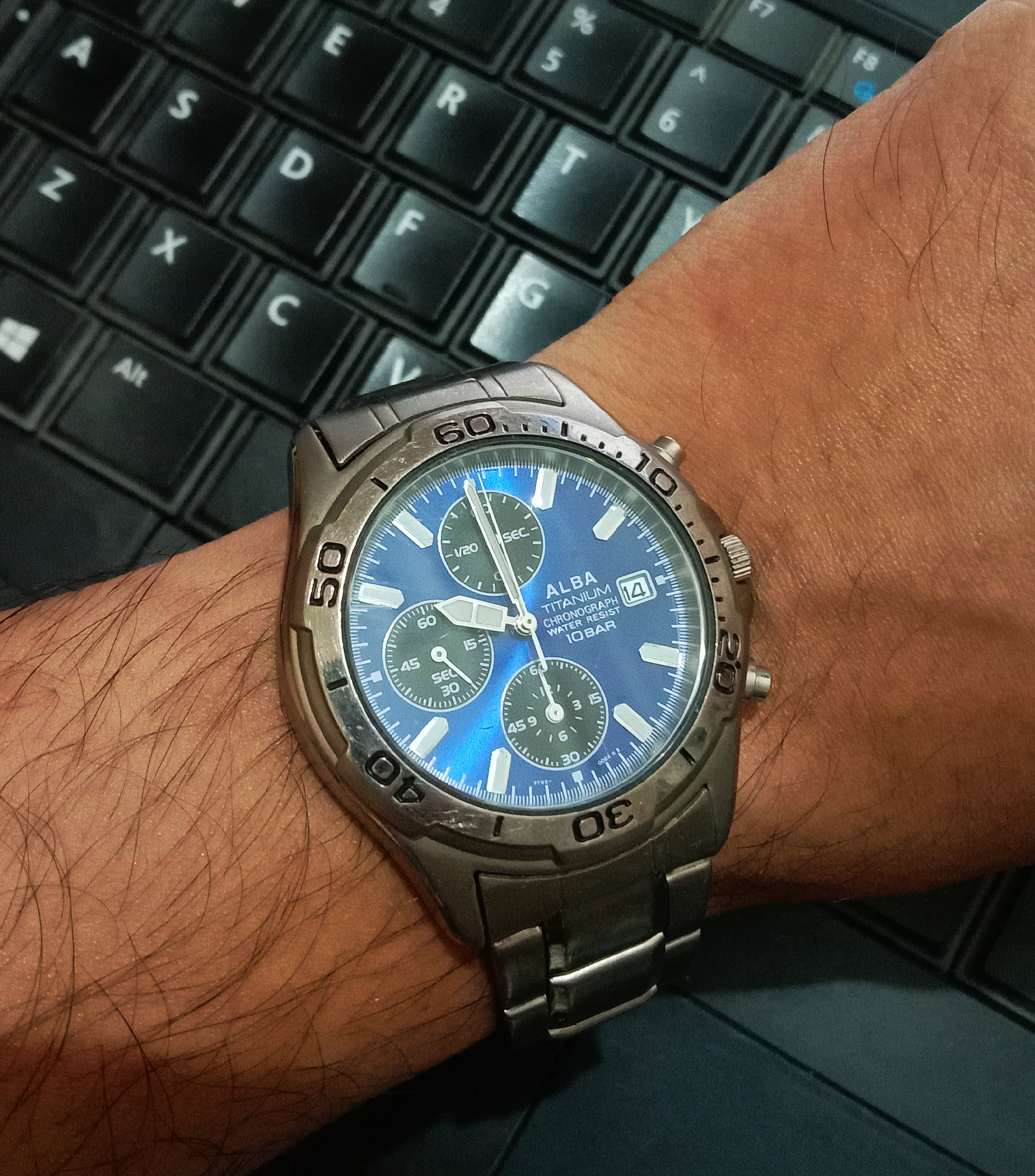
Alba watch with a 12-hour, 1/20 second chronograph. This watch uses a 7T92 movement manufactured by Seiko

Alba is a sub-brand of Seiko Watch Corporation that produces a line of wristwatches. It first appeared in 1979 in Japan.

== History ==
Using Seiko's own family of movements but with modern styling designed to appeal to younger customers, Alba watches are primarily aimed at Asian and Middle Eastern markets in the hope of creating long-term loyalty to the Seiko group as these customers' purchasing power increases. The word 'Alba' translates to 'dawn' in Italian, and Spanish.

Alba has often adopted parent company Seiko's watch designs, notably those of Italian automotive designer Giorgetto Giugiaro.

== See also ==
- Pulsar
