= Grand Seiko =

Japanese luxury watch brand

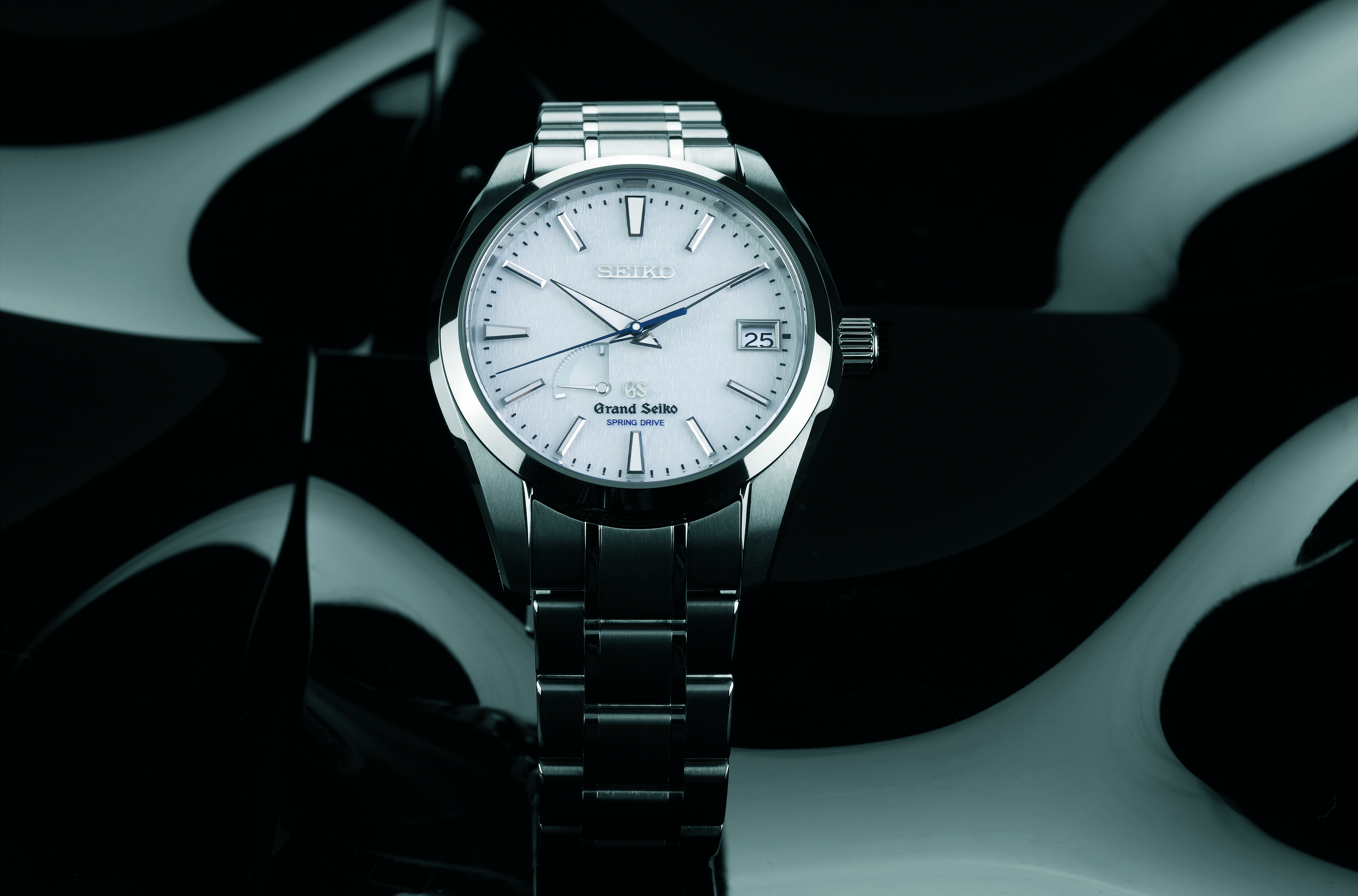
- A Grand Seiko SBGA011 with a Spring Drive movement
- Product type: Watches
- Current owner: Seiko Watch Corporation
- Country: Japan
- Introduced: 1960
- Markets: Worldwide
- Website: grand-seiko.com

Grand Seiko is a Japanese luxury watch brand owned by Seiko Watch Corporation, a subsidiary of Seiko Group Corporation. It began in 1960 as Seiko's highest-grade domestic watch line. The final new mechanical model of its first production period appeared in 1972, and manufacture of the remaining mechanical Grand Seiko watches ended in 1975. The name returned on a quartz watch in 1988. A newly developed mechanical movement followed in 1998.

Grand Seiko has been distributed internationally since 2010. In 2017, Seiko began presenting it as a separate brand, removing the Seiko name from new Grand Seiko dials while retaining the same corporate ownership. The brand produces watches with mechanical, quartz and Spring Drive movements in Japan. Its design is associated with the angular case and dial conventions of the 1967 44GS and, since 2020, the related Evolution 9 design code.

The brand's international expansion has formed part of Seiko's strategy to move its watch business toward higher-priced products and to compete more directly with Swiss luxury-watch groups. Grand Seiko watches have received prizes at the Grand Prix d'Horlogerie de Genève (GPHG), including the Men's Watch Prize in 2021 and the Chronometry Prize in 2022.

== History ==
=== Origins and first mechanical period ===
The first Grand Seiko was introduced in December 1960 by Suwa Seikosha, the company now known as Seiko Epson. It used the hand-wound calibre 3180 and was positioned above Seiko's existing Lord Marvel and Crown watches. A separate Grand Seiko accuracy standard was introduced in 1966.

The 62GS, which Grand Seiko dates to 1967, was the first automatic Grand Seiko. (Note: Fratello Watches dates its introduction to 1966. Stockton, Michael (July 15, 2022). "The Grand Seiko 62GS—A Masterstroke of '60s Design". Fratello Watches. Archived from the original on February 9, 2026.) In 1967, Daini Seikosha produced the 44GS, whose faceted case, broad polished planes and dial furniture became the principal historical reference for the brand's later design identity. The 61GS automatic and 45GS hand-wound watches, introduced in 1968, used high-frequency movements running at 36,000 vibrations per hour (ten beats per second).

In the same period, Suwa Seikosha and Daini Seikosha entered specially prepared prototypes in the Neuchâtel Observatory chronometer competitions, beginning in 1964, and Suwa entered the Geneva Observatory competition in 1968. These were precision-test movements adjusted for the competitions rather than normal production watches. The Seiko Museum states that technology and adjustment skills developed through the program were subsequently applied to Grand Seiko and King Seiko.

Seiko introduced the Astron, the first commercially marketed quartz wristwatch, in 1969. Mechanical and quartz Grand Seiko models were then developed in parallel for several years. The last new mechanical model of the original period appeared in 1972, and production of the remaining mechanical Grand Seiko watches ended in 1975; quartz models carrying the Grand Seiko or Grand Quartz names continued. Contemporary industry reporting has described the change as the Japanese counterpart of the quartz crisis that disrupted Swiss mechanical-watch production.

=== Quartz return and mechanical revival ===
Grand Seiko returned in 1988 with the quartz-powered 95GS. In 1993, the company introduced the 9F quartz movement, designed to operate the larger hands associated with earlier Grand Seiko watches while retaining high-accuracy quartz timekeeping.

During the 1990s, Seiko repositioned Grand Seiko in the Japanese luxury market as foreign brands such as Rolex and Omega expanded their presence. A business-history study found that Grand Seiko remained rare outside Japan, reflecting Seiko's limited international luxury distribution. The 9S55, introduced in 1998 as part of the 9S5 family, was the first entirely new Grand Seiko mechanical movement in about two decades and was accompanied by a revised Grand Seiko accuracy standard.

Grand Seiko adopted Spring Drive in 2004 with the calibre 9R65. The high-frequency mechanical calibre 9S85 followed in 2009. In 2020, the brand introduced the 9SA5, the first movement in a substantially redesigned generation of Grand Seiko mechanical calibres.

=== International expansion and separate brand identity ===
Seiko began international distribution of Grand Seiko in 2010. Before then the line had been sold primarily in Japan and was little known elsewhere. International distribution was accompanied by greater emphasis on higher-priced mechanical watches, specialist retail presentation and company-operated boutiques.

At Baselworld in 2017, Seiko announced that Grand Seiko would be presented as an "entirely separate brand". New watches placed the Grand Seiko emblem at 12 o'clock and omitted the Seiko logo previously shown on the dial. The change concerned brand identity, product presentation and distribution, rather than corporate ownership; Grand Seiko remained part of Seiko Watch Corporation.

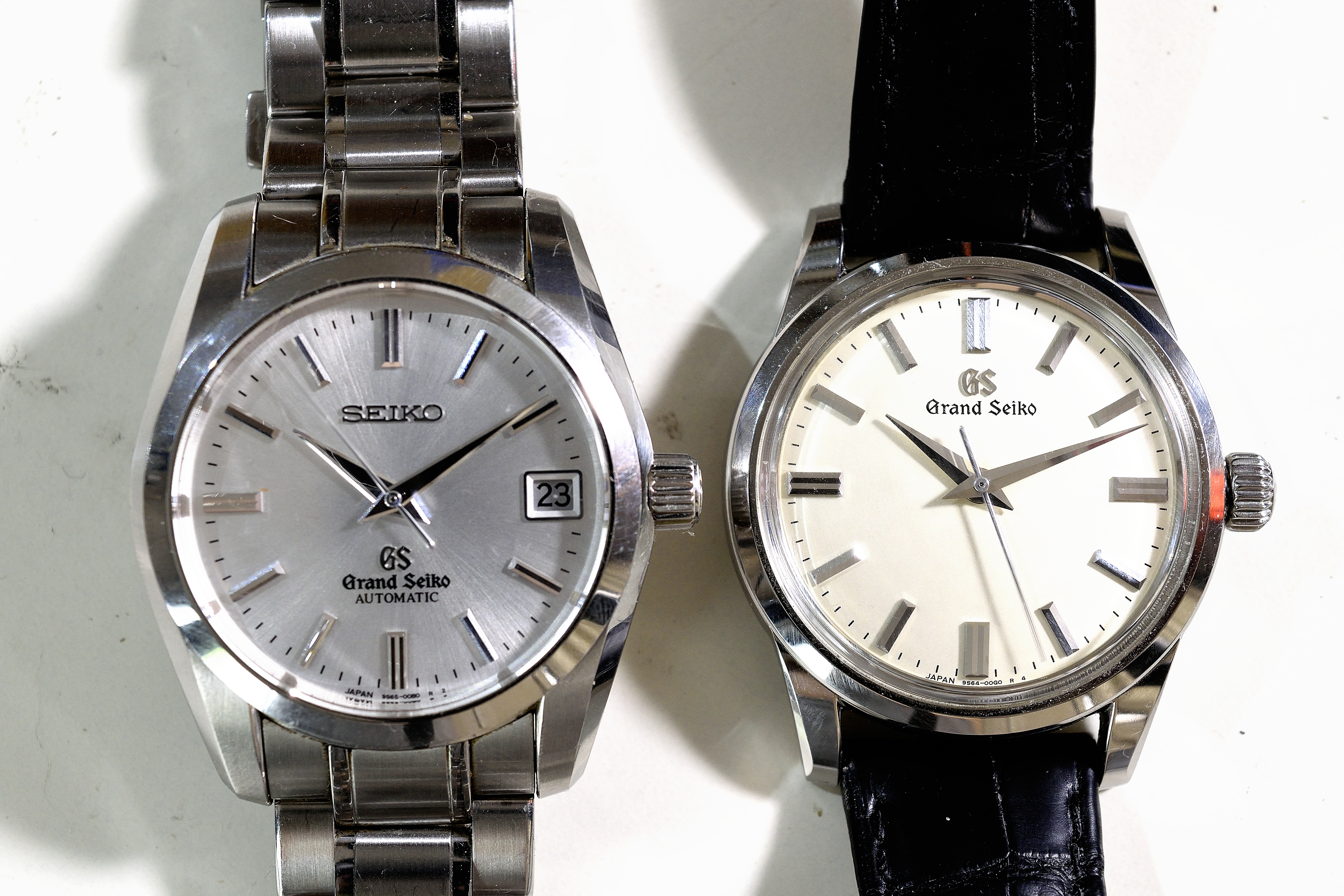
Grand Seiko dials from before 2017 (left) and after the removal of the Seiko name in 2017 (right)

In 2018, Seiko Watch Corporation established Grand Seiko Corporation of America, a wholly owned subsidiary responsible for sales and marketing in the United States. It was the first company in the group devoted solely to Grand Seiko. By the following year, company management identified expansion of overseas points of sale as a central part of its luxury-market strategy.

Grand Seiko exhibited at Watches and Wonders Geneva in 2022, where it presented its 2022 collection.

== Business and market position ==
Grand Seiko's development as an international luxury brand occurred within a wider change in the watch industry. A 2015 business-history study contrasted the Japanese industry's producer-driven model, based on manufacturing capability and product development, with the buyer-driven model adopted by leading Swiss groups, which placed greater weight on marketing and control of international distribution. It argued that Seiko's continued reliance on the former model after 1990 contributed to its loss of competitiveness in global watches, even though the company retained extensive manufacturing expertise.

Within Japan, Grand Seiko occupied a higher position than Seiko products commonly exported during the late twentieth century. In 2004, industry reporting described Grand Seiko as a mostly domestic collection competing with Swiss brands, while noting that Seiko's international image was still associated mainly with lower-priced watches.

Drawing chiefly on a memoir by a former Seiko Watch executive, a 2024 Aichi University management study described the turnaround as involving changes in marketing strategy and organization. According to the study, Seiko's domestic and overseas sales operations had previously been separated, while Grand Seiko was largely confined to the domestic market and often displayed beside lower-priced Seiko products. Following the financial crisis of 2008–2009, the company integrated product planning and parts of its domestic and overseas sales organization, expanded premium watch salons and boutiques, and used Grand Seiko as a focus of its move toward higher-priced products.

The same study described removal of the Seiko name from Grand Seiko dials in 2017 as a response to the Seiko name's association outside Japan with affordable and mid-priced watches. Contemporary industry reporting likewise treated the new identity as an attempt to market Grand Seiko separately while retaining its manufacturing and corporate links with the wider group. Press accounts subsequently described the United States as an important target for the brand's international expansion. Seiko reported that Grand Seiko's overseas sales exceeded its domestic sales for the first time in fiscal year 2022.

== Movements and technology ==
Grand Seiko's modern movements are divided into three main families: 9S mechanical, 9F quartz and 9R Spring Drive. They are developed and manufactured within the Seiko group in Japan, although production is divided between different subsidiaries and locations.

=== Mechanical ===
The 9S55 of 1998 established the modern 9S mechanical family. In 2009, the 9S85 restored the 36,000-vibrations-per-hour frequency used by some Grand Seiko movements in the late 1960s. The 9S65 followed in 2010 with a 72-hour power reserve, and the 9S86 of 2014 combined the high-frequency movement with a GMT function. High-frequency operation divides each second into ten beats, but requires additional torque and places greater demands on the escapement.

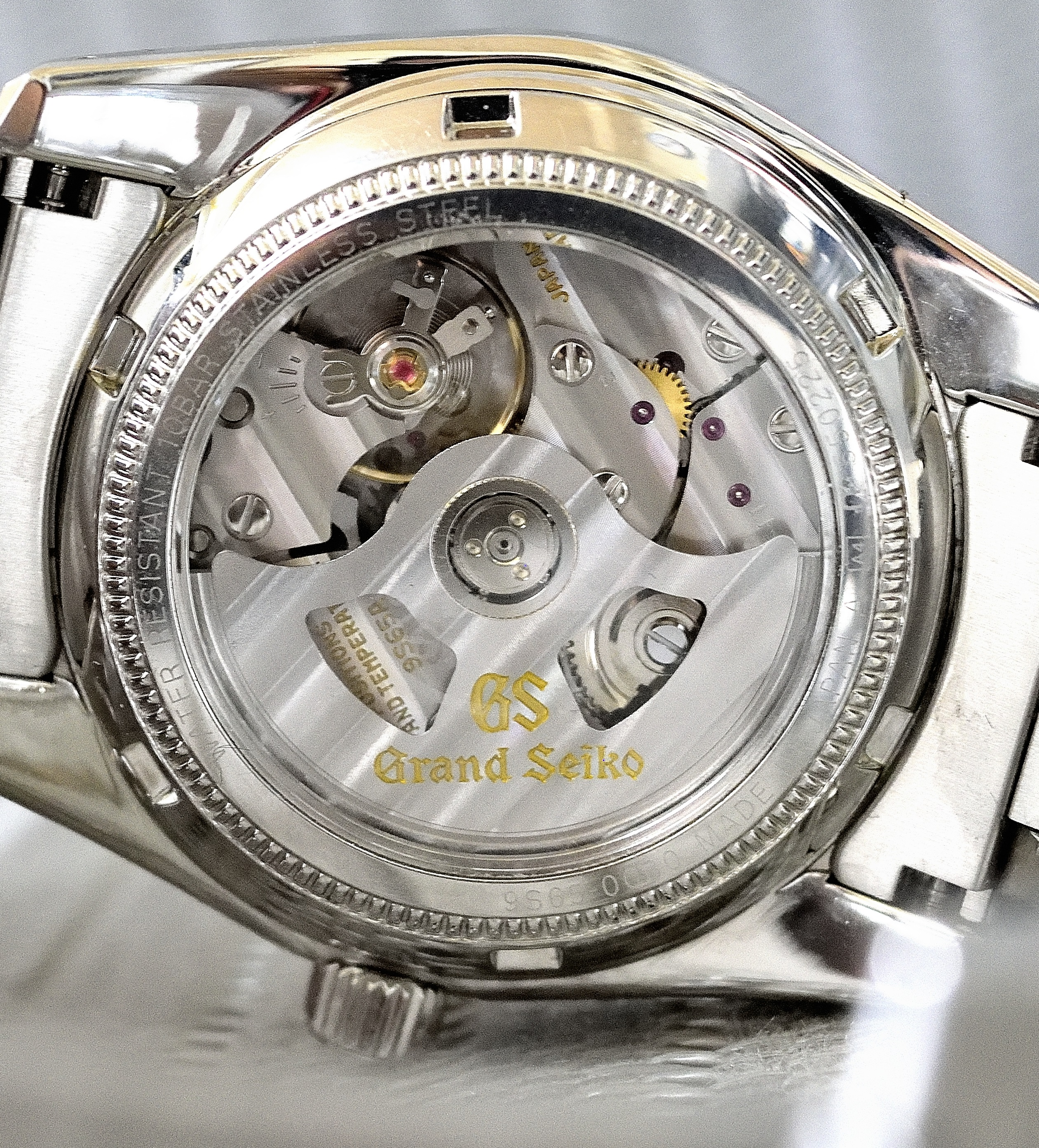
Grand Seiko calibre 9S65 automatic movement

Introduced in 2020, the automatic 9SA5 represented a more extensive redesign. Technical coverage described Grand Seiko's "Dual Impulse Escapement" as transmitting energy directly from the escape wheel to the balance in one direction and through the pallet fork in the other. The movement also uses a free-sprung balance, operates at 36,000 vibrations per hour and has an 80-hour power reserve. It powered the SLGH005, which won the GPHG Men's Watch Prize in 2021.

=== Quartz ===
A 2017 technology-history report written by a former Seiko Epson engineer described the 9F quartz movement, introduced in 1993, as being designed around the appearance and hand proportions of earlier mechanical Grand Seiko watches. A twin-pulse motor supplies sufficient torque to move relatively large hands, while a backlash-control mechanism reduces the visible shudder or misalignment of the seconds hand. The movement encloses parts of the gear train to reduce the entry of dust and retain lubricants. Its original specification included annual accuracy of ±10 seconds and a three-year battery life.

=== Spring Drive ===
Spring Drive is powered by a mainspring and gear train, as in a mechanical watch, but replaces the conventional escapement with a system consisting of a glide wheel, quartz oscillator, integrated circuit and electromagnetic brake. The regulating system controls the unwinding of the mainspring and produces continuous rather than stepwise motion of the seconds hand. Grand Seiko introduced its first automatic Spring Drive movement, the 9R65, in 2004.

In 2020, the 9RA5 extended the power reserve to five days and reorganized the movement's architecture. In 2025, Grand Seiko introduced the 9RB2, the first movement designated Spring Drive U.F.A. (Ultra Fine Accuracy). It was rated to ±20 seconds per year, compared with accuracy normally stated per month for standard Spring Drive movements. Grand Seiko attributed the increased stability to a three-month ageing process for the quartz oscillator, temperature compensation and vacuum sealing of the oscillator and sensor. In 2026, Grand Seiko introduced the related 9RB1 for two U.F.A. diving watches. The movement retained annual accuracy of ±20 seconds and moved the power-reserve indicator to the dial side.

== Design ==
Grand Seiko's historical design language developed from the "Grammar of Design", a set of principles formulated for Seiko watches in the early 1960s. The approach emphasized flat and geometrically defined surfaces, faceted forms, clear transitions between polished and brushed finishes, and legible hands and hour markers. It was applied to Grand Seiko and King Seiko before influencing other Seiko lines.

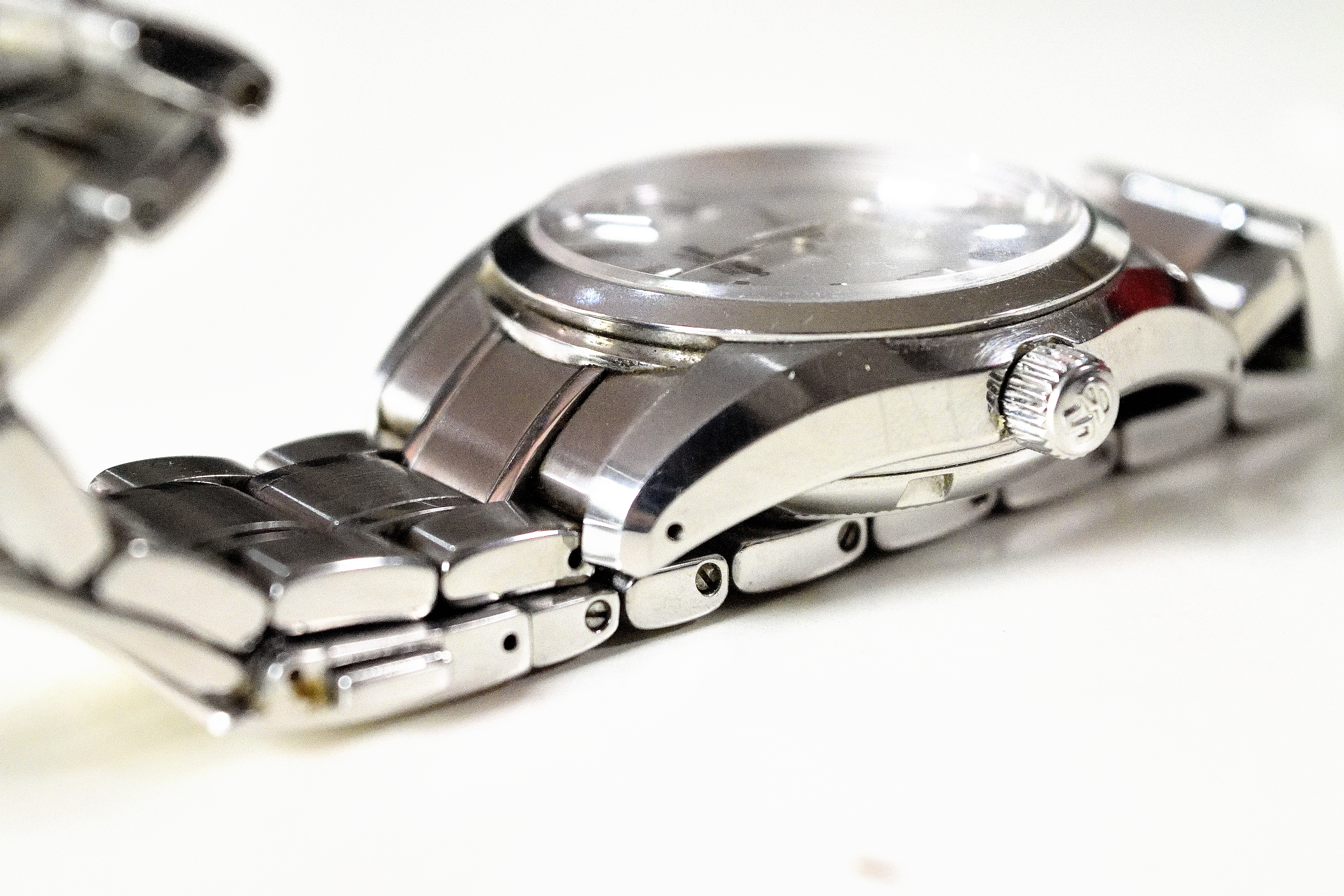
Side view of a Grand Seiko SBGR051, showing the polished case planes and sharply defined ridges

The 44GS of 1967 is treated by the company as the first complete expression of what it later named the "Grand Seiko Style". Its typical elements include a low bezel, broad flat case planes, sharply defined ridges, multifaceted indexes and hands, and highly reflective polished surfaces. The polishing process commonly called Zaratsu polishing (ザラツ研磨, Zaratsu kenma) uses the side of a hard rotating disc to create flat surfaces and sharp intersections. The name derives from the Japanese pronunciation of "Sallaz", the name engraved on German-made polishing machines acquired by Seiko in the 1950s; it is not the name of a traditional Japanese metalworking technique. Grand Seiko describes the resulting finish as "distortion-free mirror polishing".

The Evolution 9 design code was introduced in 2020. It retains the emphasis on faceted hands, indexes and contrasting finishes associated with the 44GS, while specifying broader indexes, a more prominent 12 o'clock marker, wider bracelets and a lower centre of gravity on the wrist. The code therefore represents an extension of the earlier design language rather than a replacement for it.

== Manufacture ==
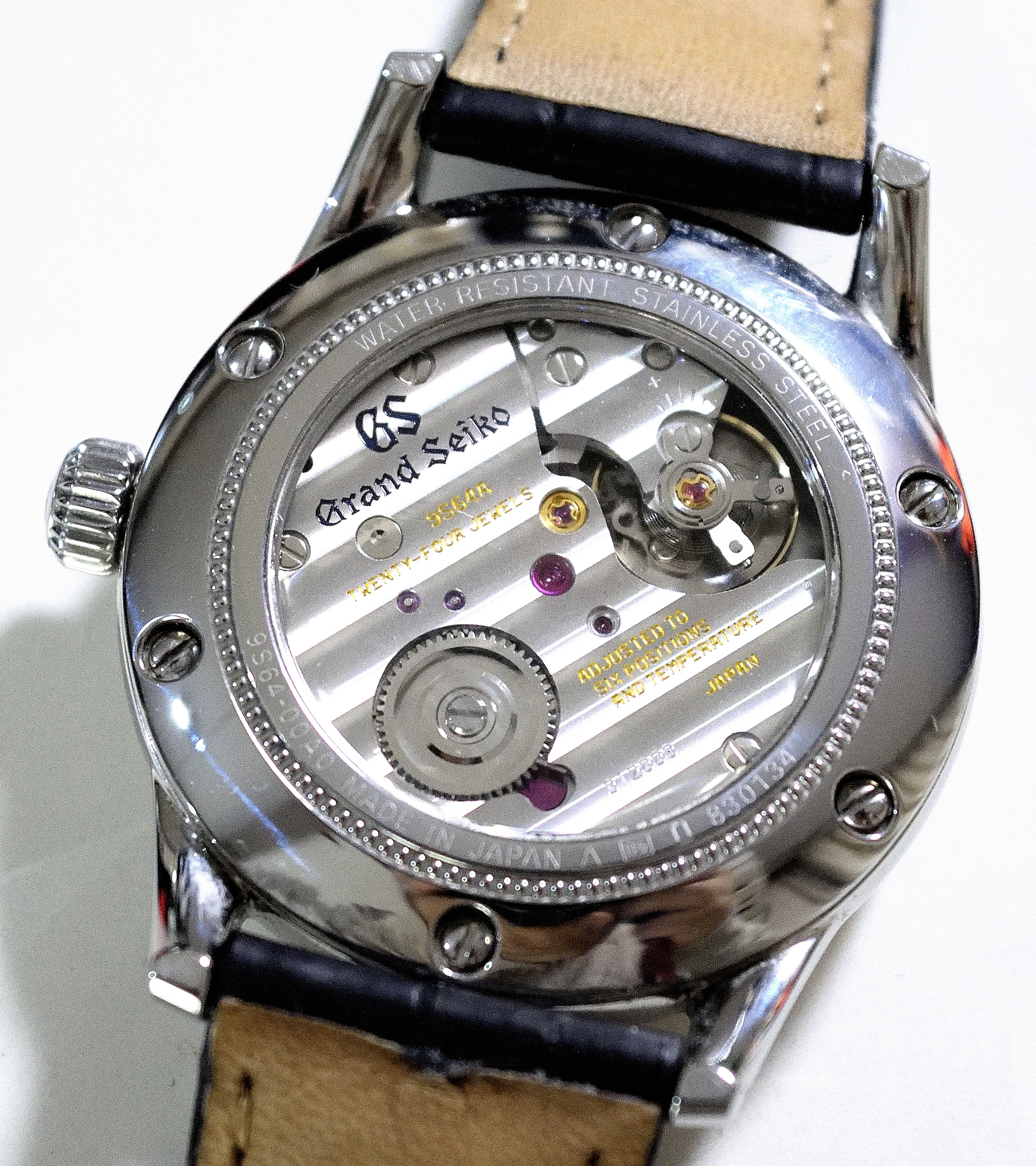
A hand-wound Grand Seiko calibre 9S64

Mechanical 9S watches are made by Morioka Seiko Instruments at the Grand Seiko Studio Shizukuishi in Shizukuishi, Iwate Prefecture. The present studio opened in 2020 within an existing watch-manufacturing site and was designed by architect Kengo Kuma. It combines watch assembly and adjustment areas with exhibition and visitor spaces. Quartz 9F and Spring Drive 9R watches are produced by Seiko Epson at the Shinshu Watch Studio in Shiojiri, Nagano Prefecture.

The production system is vertically integrated across the Seiko group, including movement design, component manufacture, assembly, adjustment and testing. At Shizukuishi, specialist teams assemble and regulate mechanical movements. Before casing, each 9S movement is tested for 17 days in six positions and at three temperatures under the Grand Seiko Standard.

The Micro Artist Studio, established in 2000 inside the Seiko Epson facility in Shiojiri, is a small workshop responsible for highly finished Spring Drive watches sold under Grand Seiko's Masterpiece Collection. In 2016, it produced its first Grand Seiko movement, the 9R01 used in the Spring Drive 8 Days watch.

== Reception and awards ==
In 2014, the Grand Seiko Hi-Beat 36000 GMT won the "Petite Aiguille" prize at the GPHG. The SLGH005, using the 9SA5 movement, won the Men's Watch Prize in 2021. In 2022, the Kodo Constant-force Tourbillon won the Chronometry Prize. The Kodo combines a tourbillon and constant-force mechanism on the same axis and was Grand Seiko's first mechanical complication watch. The Spring Drive U.F.A. SLGB003 was entered in the Sports Watch category in 2025; that year's category prize went to Chopard's Alpine Eagle 41 SL Cadence 8HF.

The awards accompanied a broader change in the brand's reception outside Japan. Business and industry reporting during the 2010s increasingly discussed Grand Seiko as a competitor in the international luxury segment rather than solely as a high-grade Japanese domestic line. This repositioning occurred against the background of Seiko's earlier difficulty in marketing luxury watches through an international distribution system associated mainly with mass-market products.
