= DECwriter =

1970s-80s computer terminal series

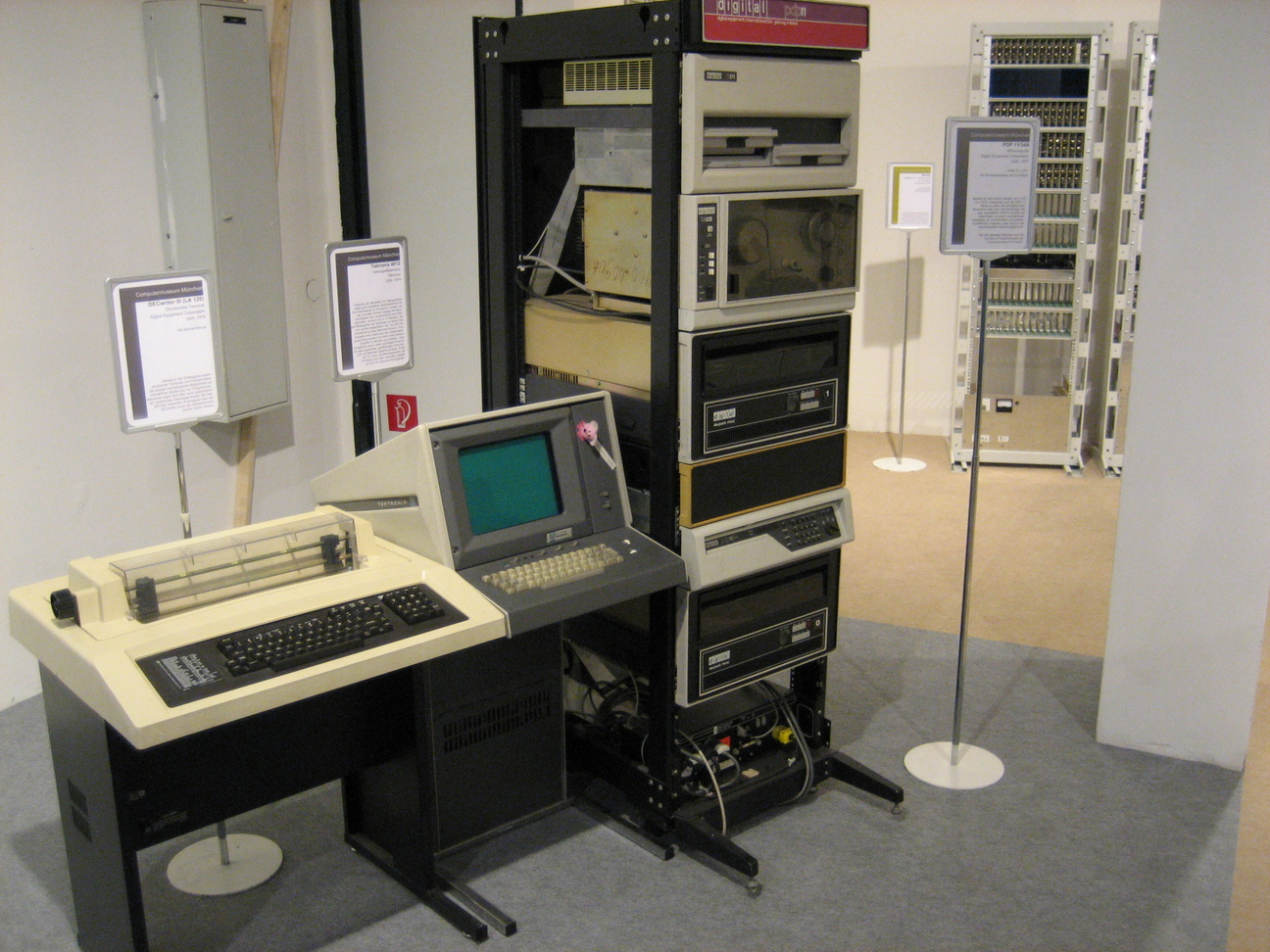
DECwriters were designed to be used as terminals, but often found themselves used as printers. In this example, connected to a PDP-11, it supplements the Tektronics graphics terminal beside it.

The DECwriter series was a family of computer terminals from Digital Equipment Corporation (DEC). They were typically used in a fashion similar to a teletype, with a computer output being printed to paper and the user inputting information on the keyboard. In contrast to teletypes, the DECwriters were based on dot matrix printer technology, one of the first examples of such a system to be introduced. Versions lacking a keyboard were also available for use as computer printers, which eventually became the only models as smart terminals became the main way to interact with mainframes and minicomputers in the 1980s.

There were four series of machines, starting with the original DECwriter in 1970, the DECwriter II in 1974, DECwriter III in 1978, and the final DECwriter IV in 1982. The first three were physically similar, large machines mounted on a stand normally positioned above a box of fanfold paper. They differed primarily in speed and the selection of computer interfaces. The IV was significantly different, intended for desktop use and looking more like an IBM Selectric typewriter than a traditional printer. Most models were available without a keyboard for print-only usage, in which case they were later known as DECprinters.

The DECwriters were among DEC's best-selling products, notably the II and III series.

== DECwriter ==
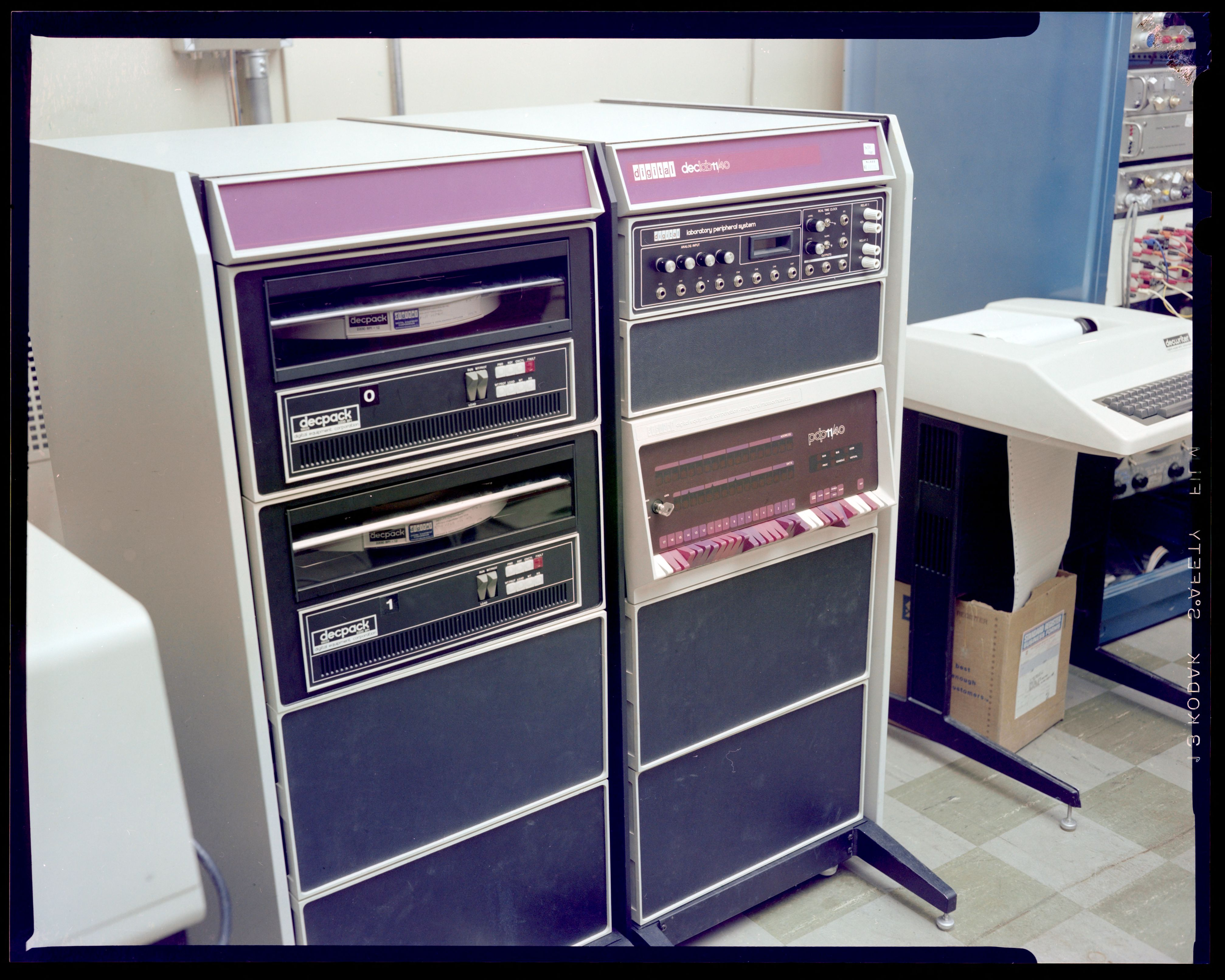
An original DECwriter is connected to this PDP-11/40 minicomputer

The original DECwriter was introduced in November 1970 at the Fall Joint Computer Conference. (Note: The LA30 manual is dated 1971, which suggests it was not available until that year.) Also known by its model number, LA30, it was one of the earliest dot matrix printers to be introduced to market, only months after the seminal Centronics 101 that May at the Spring Joint Computer Conference. At the time, most small computer systems were accessed using surplus or new teletype units, such as the popular ASR-33. The LA30 was intended to be used in the same general fashion (although it lacked any ability to read or output punched tape). As such, its only computer interface was a 30 mA current loop, as used on teletype machines, with the explicit goal of "having been designed to replace the standard Teletype Model 33, 35 and 37 KSR".

The LA30 used a 64-character ASCII-based character set, lacking lower-case characters and printing them in upper-case. It used a 7-pin print head with glyphs in a 5x7 grid. It normally printed 80-column lines on standard 9 7/8 inch wide tractor feed paper. It could print up to 30 characters per second (cps), matching the maximum interface speed of 300 bit/s (30 cps, assuming one start and one stop bit). The interface could also run at 110 and 150 bit/s. However, carriage returns required 1/3 of a second, during which time the host computer had to send data it would know would not be printed, the so-called "fill characters" that were commonly required by printers of the era.

Mechanically, the machine was 2 by 2 feet (0.61 by 0.61 m) and came mounted on robust legs that raised the keyboard to standard desk height with the top 31 inches (790 mm) from the ground. Normally, a box of fanfold paper would be placed below the printer mechanism and feed upward though a slot in the bottom of the stand. The casing around the keyboard was curved, somewhat similar to the ADM-3A. The entire front cover lifted upward to provide access to the printing mechanism, both for basic maintenance and for feeding in new paper. DEC suggested leaving 16 inches (410 mm) behind the system to provide enough room to swing it fully open.

In June 1972, DEC introduced two new versions of the DECwriter, the LA30A which lacked a keyboard and was used as a dedicated printer, and the LA30-E which added an RS-232 interface option, the "E" standing for the new name for the port, EIA-232. A later addition was the LA30-P, the "P" referring to the addition of a parallel Centronics port, which had become an almost universal de facto standard by the mid-1970s.

== DECwriter II ==
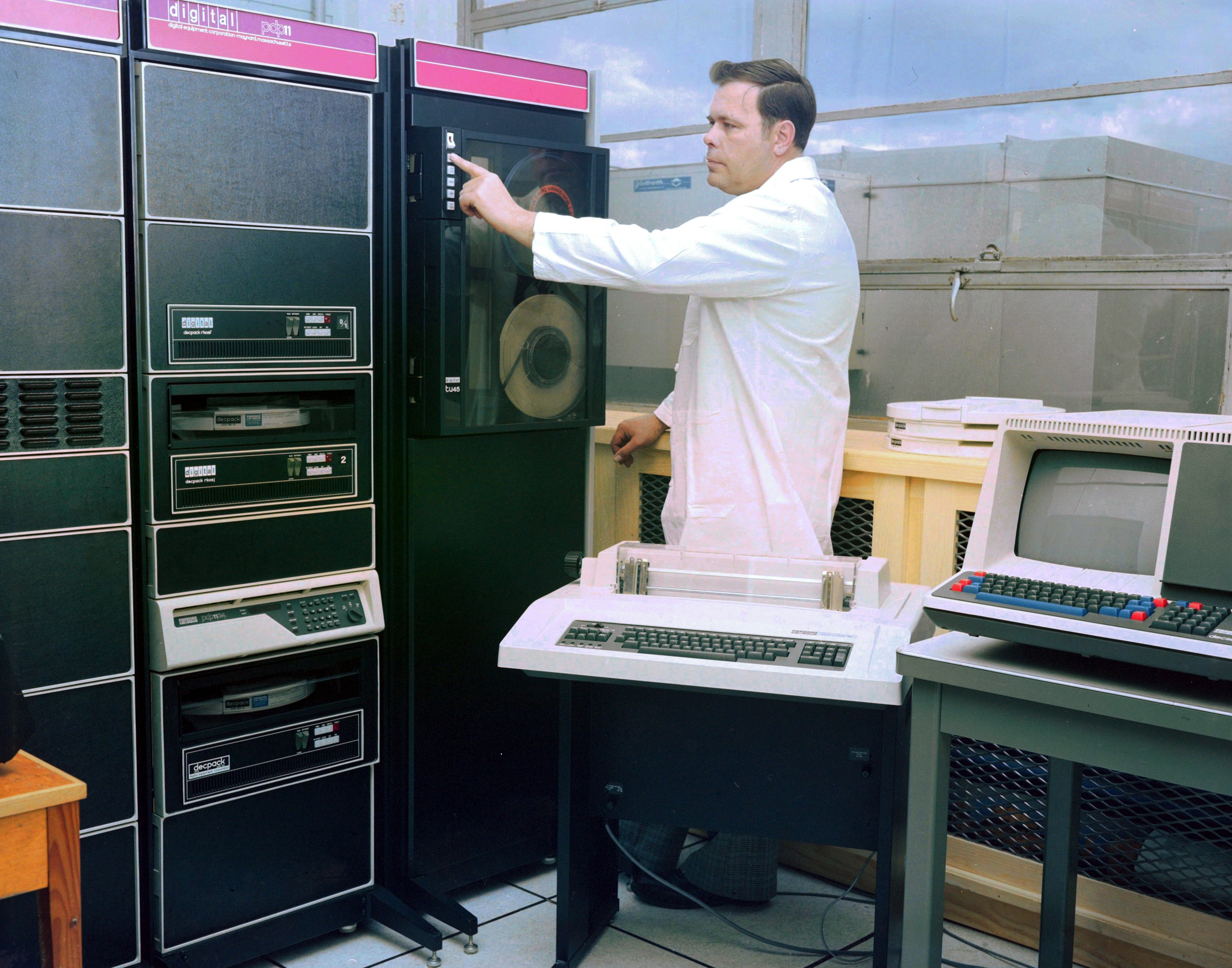
The DECwriter II was often connected to small minicomputer systems, such as the PDP-11/34 in this research lab.

A replacement for the original product line was announced in August 1974 with the introduction of the DECwriter II series and its first model, the LA36. The LA36 used the same basic printing mechanism as the LA30, and was physically similar although smaller and more rectangular. Like the LA30, the LA36 was also offered in a keyboard-less printer-only model, in this case known as the LA35.

The primary change was the addition of a data buffer that allowed it to store characters. This meant the terminal could continue accepting data from the host computer while the printer was performing carriage returns or other time-consuming operations, and then resume printing without loss of data. When the print head fell behind, it began printing characters as fast as possible until the buffer was empty again, at speeds as high as 60 cps. This had the added advantage that the host computer did not have to insert fill characters, which in turn led to simpler interfacing requirements and reduced device driver complexity.

There were numerous other changes as well. The character set now included a complete 128-character ASCII set, including upper and lower case as well as various control characters. The character set was stored in read-only memory (ROM), and optional ROMs for Katakana and the APL symbols were also available. The 63-key keyboard followed the ANSI X4.14-1971 typewriter layout, and included a further 19 keys for numeric input and various controls. The tractor feed was much more flexible, with a horizontally-fixed pin-drive on the left and an adjustable one on the right, allowing it to feed paper from 3 to 14.875 inches (76.2 to 377.8 mm) wide and to print up to 132 columns. The print head had enough force to print through six pieces of paper, allowing it to print using carbon paper or copy paper forms.

The teleprinters were so popular that several third party companies introduced add-on cards to give the systems even more functionality. The Intertec Superdec offered 1200 bit/s support, double-wide characters, APL characters, and even user-defined character sets. The Datasouth DS120 was similar, lacking the character sets but adding bidirectional printing. The Selanar Graphics II add-on offered bitmapped graphics support as well as increased speeds to 9,600 bit/s.

== DECprinter I, new DECwriter IIs ==
The DECprinter I, model LA180, was introduced in September 1976. This was essentially a simplified version of the LA35, offered only with a Centronics port to provide speeds up to 180 cps. In November, the same basic mechanism was used as the basis for new versions of the LA35 and LA36, differing primarily in using serial ports which made them easier to connect to DEC systems. These models went on to become one of DEC's best-selling products.

== DECwriter III ==
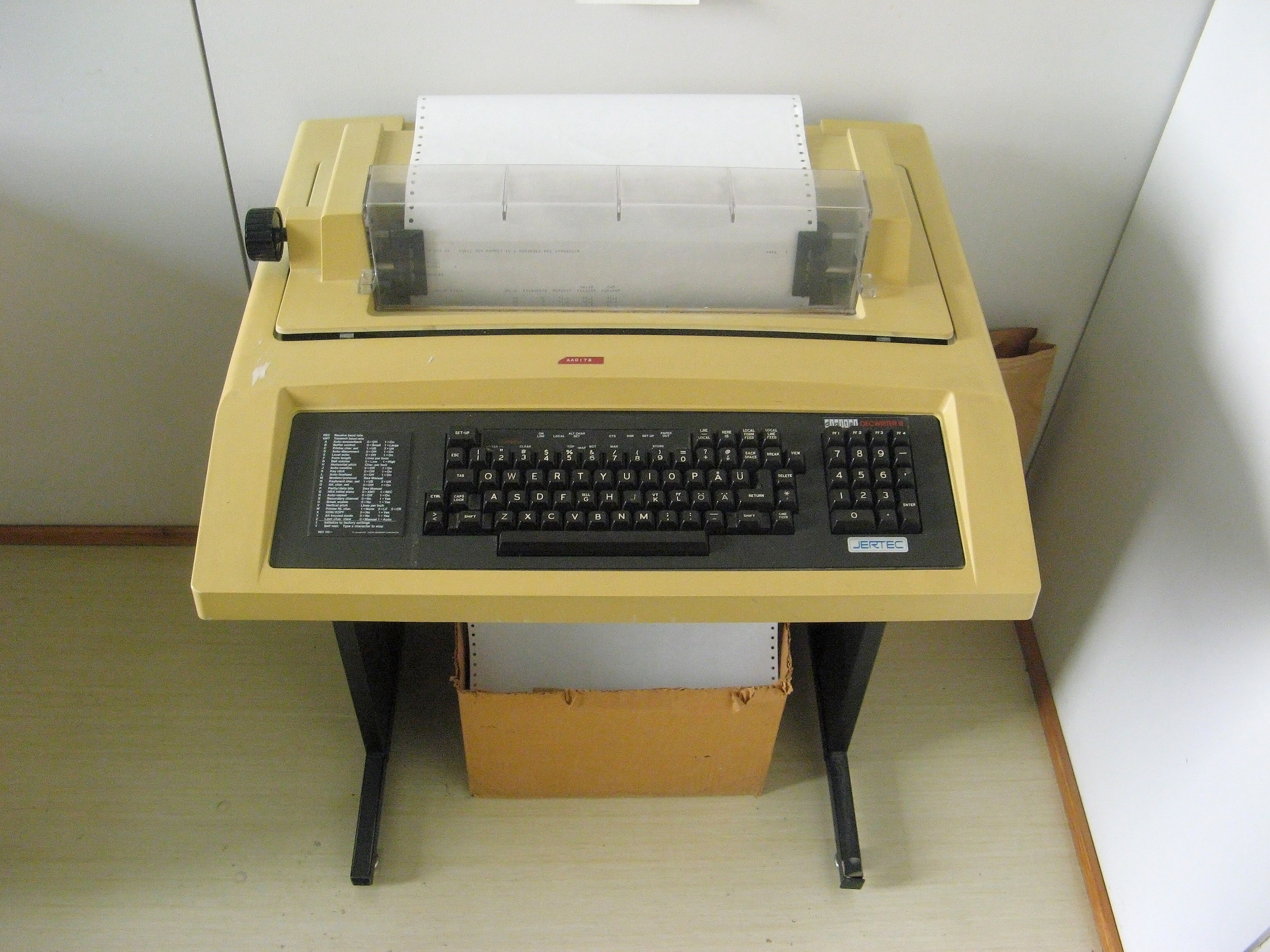
DECwriter III. The DECprinter lacked the keyboard in front, but was otherwise identical.

January 1977 saw the introduction of the DECwriter III, or LS120. This was a cost-reduced and improved version of the LA36 that supported only serial input out of the box, lacking the former current loop interface. Three new versions based on the LS120 were introduced in November 1978, the print-only LA120-RA DECprinter III, the LA120-DA which replaced the LA36 terminal, and the LA120-RB, otherwise similar to the RA but able to print on up to nine-thick copy paper as opposed to the normal six-thick of the base model.

The LA120's were similar to the earlier models mechanically, with only minor changes to the layout of the printer and the floor stand. Internally, the primary change was the addition of a 1 kB character buffer, which allowed it to store many lines of text. The printer electronics examined the data, skipping over blank areas at high speed, and optimizing printing in both directions by reading backward through the buffer where appropriate. The overall speed increased to 180 cps. In addition to the character sets of the II series, the III added new character sets with National Replacement Character Sets for Finland, Denmark, Sweden, Germany, Norway, and France. It also offered eight options for character width (narrow or wide) and double-strike for bold.

The LA120s normally were supplied with only an RS-232 interface, but the LA12X-AL add-on kit provided a current loop interface for those who still needed it, while the LA12X-BB added parallel interface, and the LA12X-CB connected to the Unibus. The LA12X-DL option expanded the character buffer to 4 kB.

== DECwriter IV ==
The first complete redesign of the DECwriter line was introduced in June 1982 (Note: In this case, the manual is from October, pre-dating this release date. Some investigation is warranted.) with the DECwriter IV. In contrast to the earlier models, which were large standalone units on their own floor-standing pedestals, the IV series were small desktop systems that looked like contemporary electric typewriters, notably the IBM Selectric. They were slow, at 30 cps, and were not intended as outright replacements for the III series, which were more suited to unattended computer-room console terminal operation.

Two models were offered, the LA34 which used a typewriter-like roller feed mechanism, and the LA38 which added a tractor feed mechanism, which could also be purchased separately for the LA34. Both fed paper in from the top, like a typewriter, and did not need any room below them for paper feeding. The LA34 was not as suited for unattended printing of large volumes of data, since its friction feed was more prone to tracking skew and paper jams than its tractor feed siblings.

The DECwriter IV series also introduced optional support for DEC's sixel graphics format, allowing it to produce black and white graphics output. This worked by sending characters using only 6 of the 8 bits of the printable character set and using those six bits to directly control six of the seven pins in the print head. This way, graphics data could be sent efficiently over 7-bit links. The printer could be commanded to expand the data horizontally to several different characters-per-inch settings.

== Letterwriter 100 ==
Otherwise similar to the IV series, the LA100 series used a nine-pin print head and offered three different printing speeds to provide what DEC referred to as draft, memo, or letter qualities. In draft mode it printed at 240 cps, while in letter quality it used a 33 by 18 dot matrix that reduced the printing rate to 30 cps. As before, the LA100 was offered as the print-only Letterprinter 100 or a variety of Letterwriter 100 terminals.

The internal character set ROM was further expanded to support the British, Finnish, French, Canadian French, German, Italian, Norwegian/Danish, Spanish, and Swedish character sets. More interesting was the addition of plug-in ROM cartridges containing the actual glyph data for the characters. The system could support two plug-in cartridges and as many as three internal ROMs (bare chips), to allow up to five character sets at a time.

== DECwriter Correspondent ==
The LA12 DECwriter Correspondent was a small form-factor terminal for portable use, weighing 20 pounds (9.1 kg). Various models offered built-in modems or other interfaces. The system was otherwise similar to the IV series in features.
