= Dot matrix =

Two-dimensional patterned array

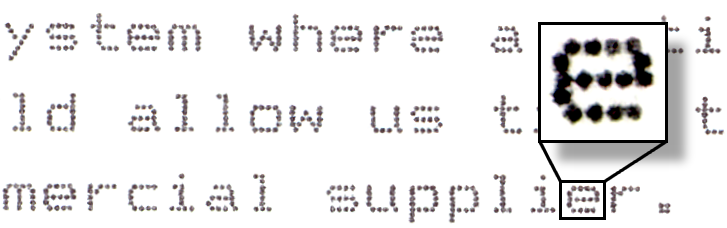
Close-up view of dot matrix text produced by a printer

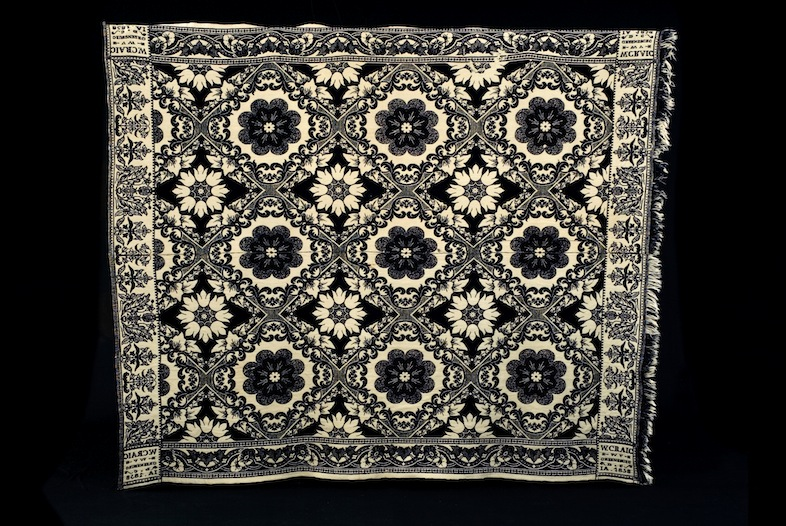
Dot matrix pattern woven into fabric in 1858 using punched cards on a Jacquard loom

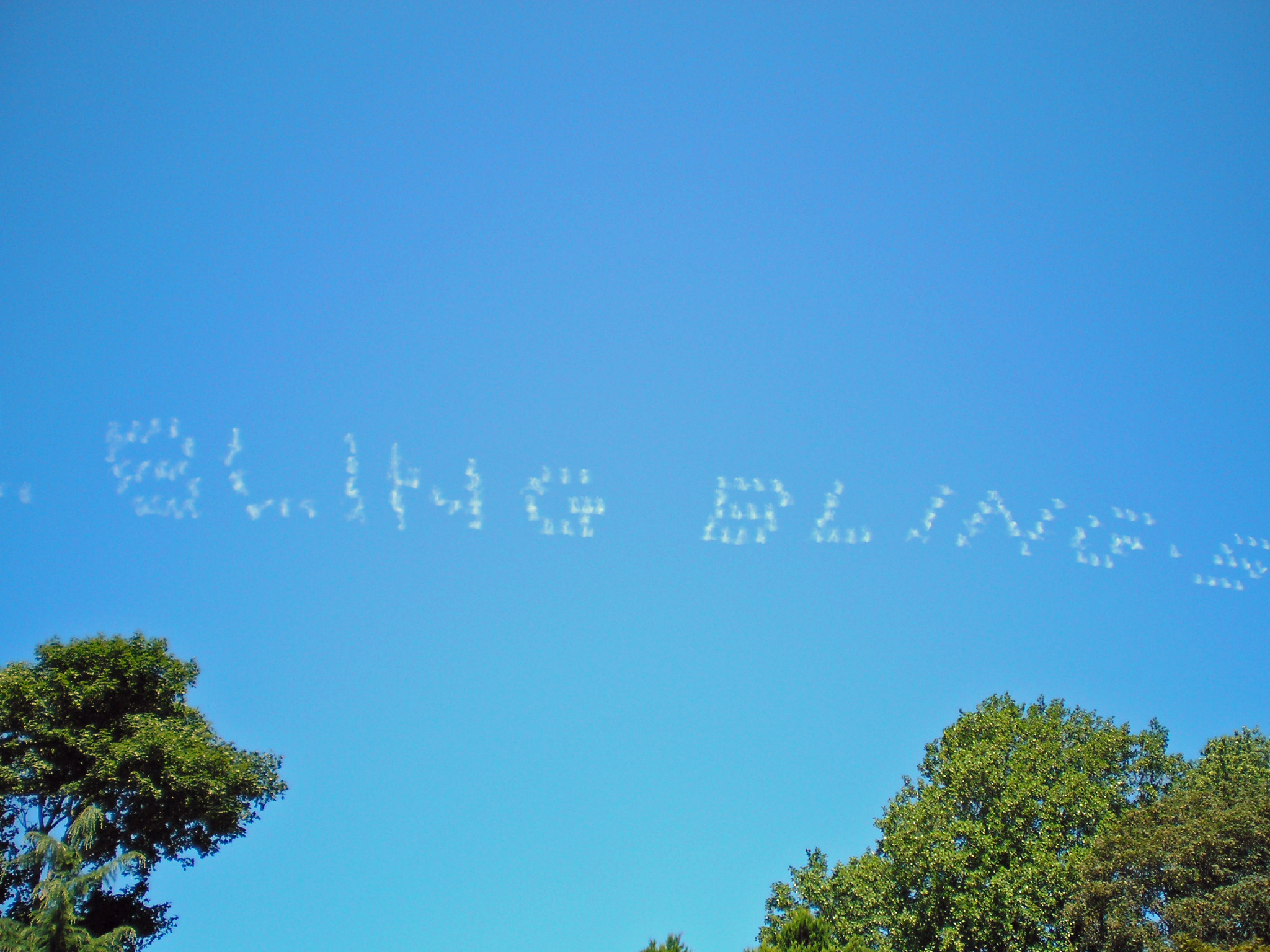
Dot matrix-style skywriting

A dot matrix is a 2-dimensional patterned array, used to represent characters, symbols and images. Most types of modern technology use dot matrices for display of information, including mobile phones, televisions, and printers. The system is also used in textiles with sewing, knitting and weaving.

An alternate form of information display using lines and curves is known as a vector display, was used with early computing devices such as air traffic control radar displays and pen-based plotters but is no longer used. Electronic vector displays were typically monochrome only, and either leave the interiors of closed vector shapes unfilled, or perform slow, time-consuming and often non-uniform shape-filling, as on pen-based plotters.

In printers, the dots are usually the darkened areas of the paper. In displays, the dots may light up, as in an LED, CRT, or plasma display, or darken, as in an LCD.

== Use in computers ==
Although the output of modern computers is generally all in the form of dot matrices (technically speaking), computers may internally store data as either a dot matrix or as a vector pattern of lines and curves. Vector data encoding requires less memory and less data storage, in situations where the shapes may need to be resized, as with font typefaces. For maximum image quality using only dot matrix fonts, it would be necessary to store a separate dot matrix pattern for the many different potential point sizes that might be used. Instead, a single group of vector shapes is used to render all the specific dot matrix patterns needed for the current display or printing task.

=== All points addressable ===
All points addressable (APA), or pixel addressable, in the context of a dot matrix on a computer monitor or any display device consisting of a pixel array, refers to an arrangement whereby bits or cells can be individually manipulated, as opposed to rewriting the whole array, or regions such as characters, every time a change is needed.

Generally, text modes are not all-points-addressable, whereas graphics modes are. With the advent of more powerful computer graphics hardware, the use and importance of text-only display modes has declined, and with graphics modes it is generally taken for granted that they are all-points-addressable.

== Use in printers ==
The process of doing dot matrix printing can involve dot matrix printers, both for impact and non-impact printers.

Almost all modern computer printers (both impact and non-impact) create their output as matrices of dots, and they may use

- laser printing
- inkjet printing
- dot matrix printers

Except for impact dot matrix printers, it is not customary to call the others by that term.

Printers that are not but what The New York Times calls a "dot-matrix impact printer" are not called dot matrix printers. Impact printers survive where multi-part forms are needed, as the pins can impress dots through multiple layers of paper to make a carbonless copy, for security purposes.

As an impact printer, the term mainly refers to low-resolution impact printers, with a column of 8, 9 or 24 "pins" hitting an ink-impregnated fabric ribbon, like a typewriter ribbon, onto the paper. It was originally contrasted with both daisy wheel printers and line printers that used fixed-shape embossed metal or plastic stamps to mark paper.

All types of electronic printers typically generate image data as a two-step process. First the information to be printed is converted into a dot matrix using a raster image processor, and the output is a dot matrix referred to as a raster image, which is a complete full-page rendering of the information to be printed. Raster image processing may occur in either the printer itself using a page description language such as Adobe PostScript, or may be performed by printer driver software installed on the user's computer.

Early 1980s impact printers used a simple form of internal raster image processing, using low-resolution built-in bitmap fonts to render raw character data sent from the computer, and only capable of storing enough dot matrix data for one printed line at a time. External raster image processing was possible such as to print a graphical image, but was commonly extremely slow and data was sent one line at a time to the impact printer.

Depending on the printer technology the dot size or grid shape may not be uniform. Some printers are capable of producing smaller dots and will intermesh the small dots within the corners of larger ones for antialiasing. Some printers have a fixed resolution across the printhead but with much smaller micro-stepping for the mechanical paper feed, resulting in non-uniform dot-overlapping printing resolutions like 600×1200 dpi.

A dot matrix is useful for marking materials other than paper. In manufacturing industry, many product marking applications use dot matrix inkjet or impact methods. This can also be used to print 2D matrix codes, e.g. Datamatrix.

== LED matrix ==
An LED matrix display scanning by rows to make the letter W

An LED matrix or LED display is a large, low-resolution form of dot-matrix display, useful both for industrial and commercial information displays as well as for hobbyist human–machine interfaces. It consists of a 2-D diode matrix with their cathodes joined in rows and their anodes joined in columns (or vice versa). By controlling the flow of electricity through each row and column pair it is possible to control each LED individually. By multiplexing, scanning across rows, quickly flashing the LEDs on and off, it is possible to create characters or pictures to display information to the user. By varying the pulse rate per LED, the display can approximate levels of brightness. Multi-colored LEDs or RGB-colored LEDs permit use as a full-color image display. The refresh rate is typically fast enough to prevent the human eye from detecting the flicker.

The primary difference between a common LED matrix and an OLED display is the large, low resolution dots. The OLED monitor functionally works the same, except there are many times more dots, and they are all much smaller, allowing for greater detail in the displayed patterns.

== See also ==
- Dot matrix printing (or impact matrix printing), a type of computer printing
- Dot-matrix display, a type of display device
- A display convention for illustrating the alignment of two DNA or protein sequences.
- QR code, a matrix of square dots
