= Continuous stationery =

Paper designed for use with dot-matrix and line printers

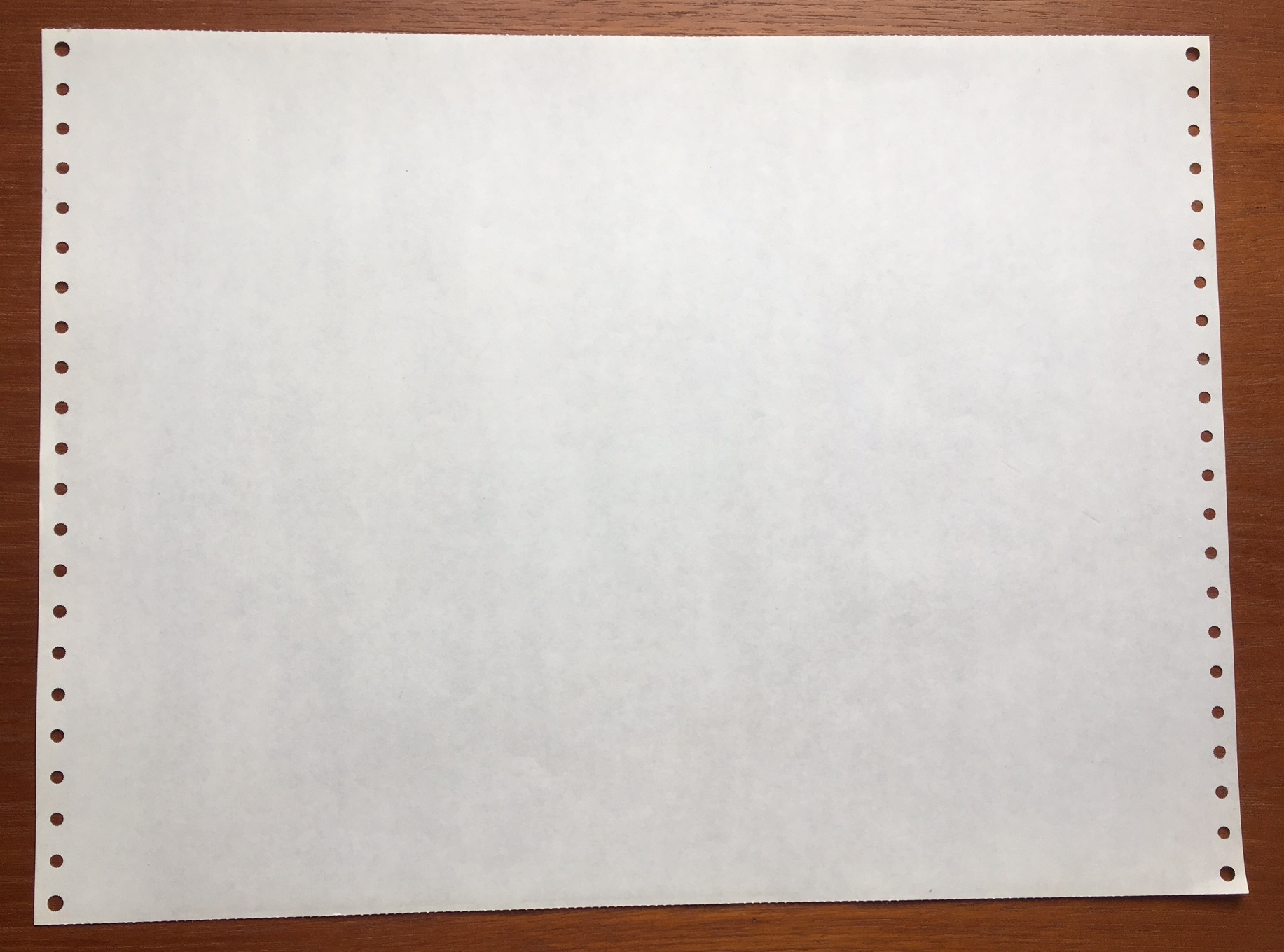
Continuous form paper sheet

Continuous stationery (UK) or continuous form paper (US) is paper which is designed for use with dot-matrix and line printers with appropriate paper-feed mechanisms. Other names include fan-fold paper, sprocket-feed paper, burst paper, lineflow (New Zealand), tractor-feed paper, and pin-feed paper. It can be single-ply (usually woodfree uncoated paper) or multi-ply (either with carbon paper between the paper layers, or multiple layers of carbonless copy paper), often described as multipart stationery or forms. Continuous stationery is often used when the final print medium is less critical in terms of the appearance at the edges, and when continuously connected individual sheets are not inconvenient for the application. Individual sheets can be separated at the perforation (leaving a slight serration), and sheets also have edges with punched holes, which also can be removed at the perforation (one typical format).

== Shape and form ==
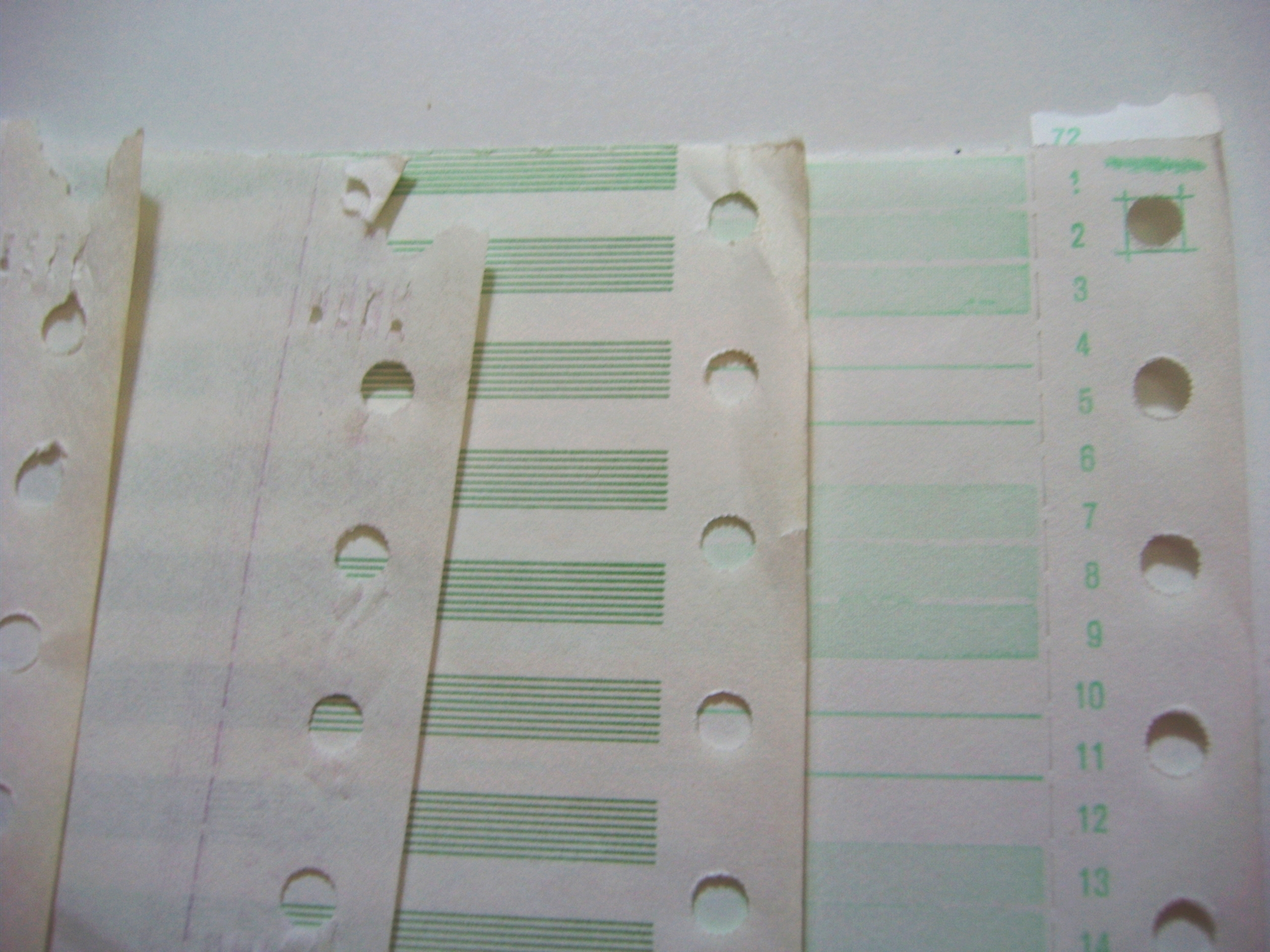
Continuous form paper edge perforations

Most continuous form paper is punched longitudinally along both edges with regularly spaced engagement holes that engage with sprocket wheels or toothed belts on the "tractor" which move the paper through the printer. It is usually perforated transversely with a line of closely spaced holes or slits which form a tear edge that allows it to be torn neatly into separate pages after printing; when fed through the printer the paper is simply a continuous sheet.

After printing the separated sheets can be held in binders by using the sprocket holes when simply required as a record. Alternatively some types of continuous form paper also have longitudinal perforations along each edge inside the engagement holes, allowing the strips with sprocket holes to be torn off the printed page.

The tear perforations may be short slits, which leave noticeable serrations when torn apart, acceptable for many business documents such as invoices or basic data (such as computer code). Where better appearance is necessary the perforations can be much finer, leaving an almost perfectly smooth edge (microperforations, microperf for short).

Continuous form paper of all types remains in production, although largely supplanted with the introduction of fast laser printers with single-sheet feed. Continuous stationery printed on a suitable printer is typically cheaper than laser printing although the output is of lower quality. If an impact printer is used multiple simultaneous copies can be printed on multipart forms. Many laser printers can print on both sides of the paper (duplex printing), which is not possible with continuous stationery.

Standard perforations are 5/32 inch in diameter (3.96875 mm, sometimes called 4 mm) and are spaced at 1/2 inch (13 mm) center-to-center. Tear-off horizontal perforations at page top/bottom are exactly in-between standard perforations, at whatever regular interval is used for that particular paper.

When the perforated edges of the paper are manufactured so that they tear off the pages in strips, those strips are known as "perfory."

== Common types ==
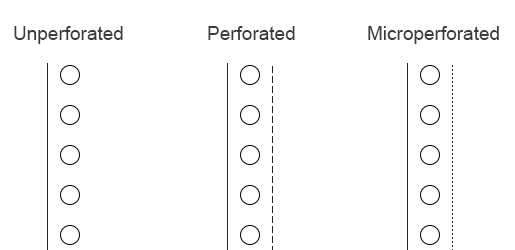
Common perforation types for continuous form paper

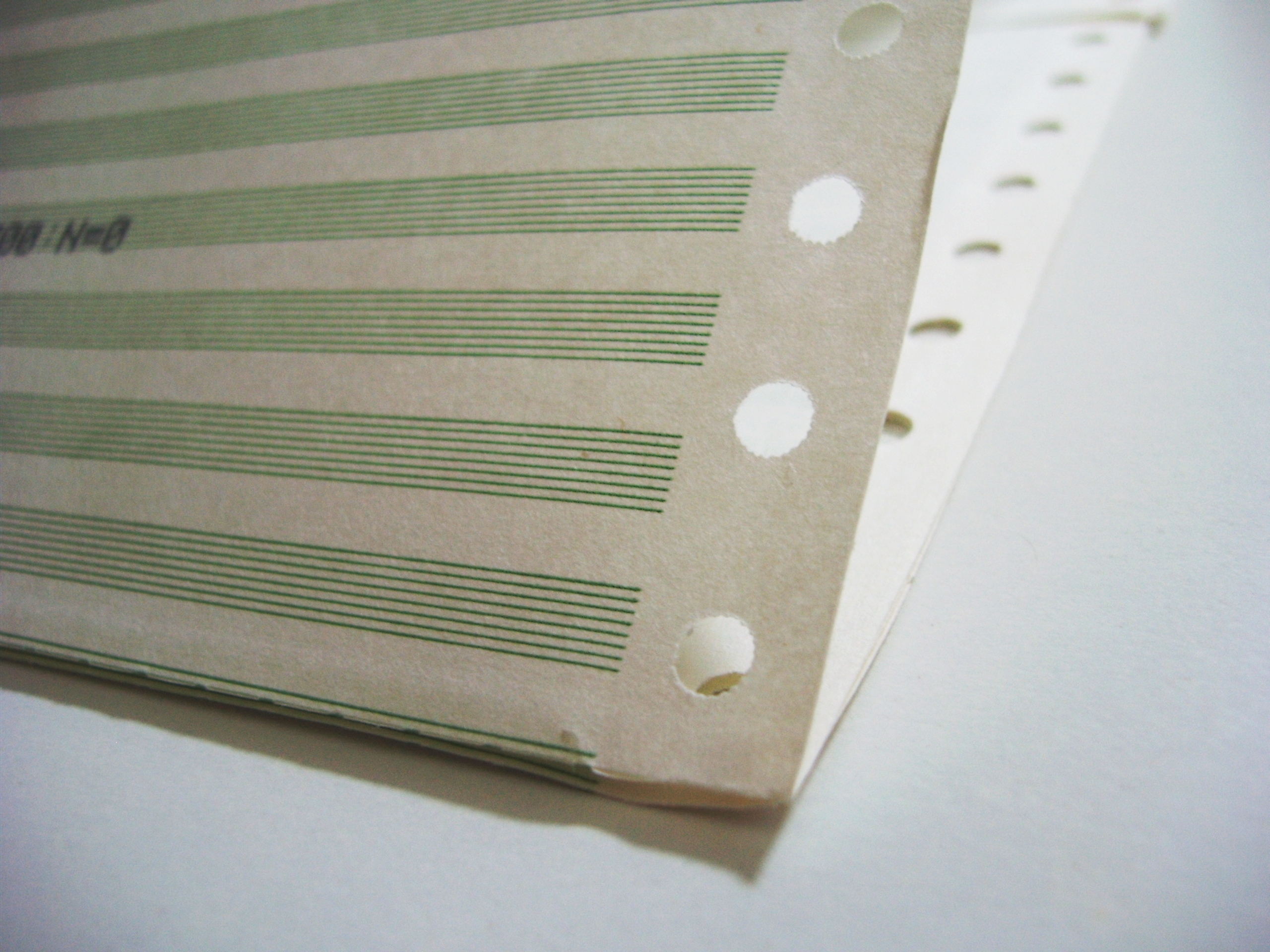
Preprinted green bar continuous form paper

The highest grade of continuous form paper uses a heavy bond weight similar to typing paper. Perforations are very small and close together, referred to as microperforations or microperf, to allow the sheets to be separated and the sprocket hole strip ("perfory," see "Shape and Form" section) torn off leaving a very smooth edge almost as if guillotine-cut.

The cheapest grade of continuous form paper is often preprinted with bars of light green lines across its width, to facilitate following a line of information across the page, a type commonly referred to as green bar, music or music-ruled paper. It is a very lightweight bond, usually without slit perforations to remove the engagement hole strips.

Common sizes in North America:

- 241 mm × 279 mm (9.5 in × 11.0 in)
- 381 mm × 279 mm (15.0 in × 11.0 in)

In Europe, both 11 and 12-inch (279 and 305 mm) form heights were common, the latter closely approaching the A4 standard sheet size (297 mm, 11.7 in).

== Printing, separation and binding ==
=== Printing ===
Printing on continuous forms was at one time the basis for many business operations, not the least of which the direct mail industry. Reader's Digest and Publisher's Clearing House relied heavily on these forms to promote their products (most often via sweepstakes), issue billing, address form letter correspondence, and manage their own business data needs. Continuous form paper is used in some of the fastest types of printing systems, some of which print text at a rate of 20,000 lpm (lines per minute). This will produce about 400 pages per minute, using about 8–11 large boxes of paper for every hour of printing (affected by character density, and other details such as paper weight).

=== Decollator ===
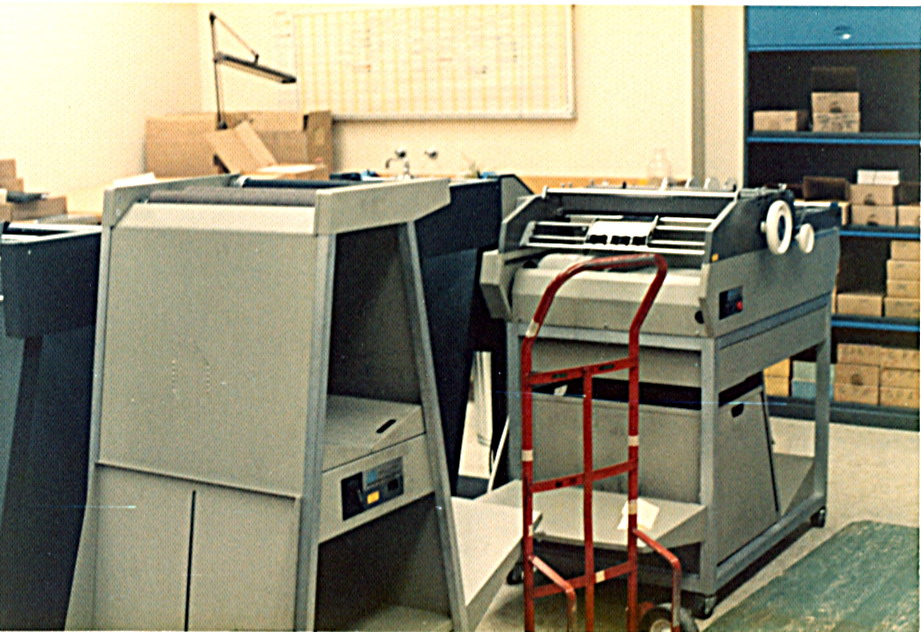
A decollator and a burster

A decollator separates multi-part continuous form paper into separate stacks of one-part continuous form paper and may also remove the carbon paper.

=== Burster ===
A burster is a machine that separates one-part continuous form paper into separate, individual, sheets along the transverse perforations. A burster was typically used with printed continuous form paper applications such as mass-mail advertising, invoices, and account statements. The machine has two sets of rollers; the first (infeed) runs at a given speed, the second (outfeed) located a specific distance away, running at a higher speed. The first form is gripped by the infeed roller and moves under the second roller. Due to the higher speed, the forms is stretched taut, forcing the perforation against a knife, thus separating the form from the continuous form. The continuous form paper then advances into the feed rollers to burst the next sheet. Bursting is often a high-speed process that allows the continuous form paper to feed in at a steady rate, with burst pages either stacked or fed into a single-sheet conveyance to the next paper processing stage. Burster equipment and paper manufactures had to generate perforation specifications so that the paper perforations reliably separated under the force of pulling the sheets apart and not tear down into the printed part of the sheet.

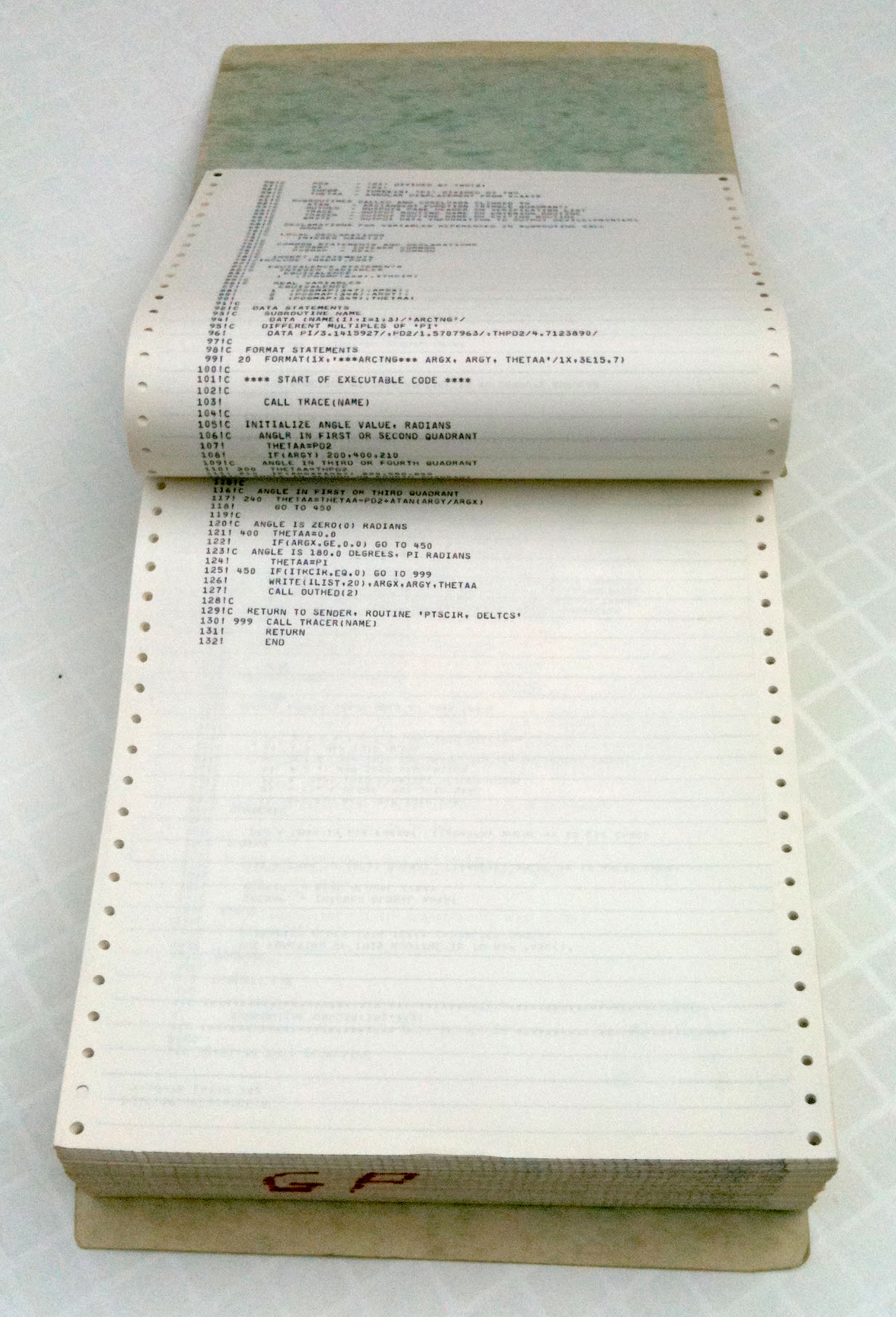
Listing of a large computer program on continuous form paper, bound in a printout binder

Large continuous documents might not be split into separate sheets. By continuously folding two single sided printed sheets back-to-back and binding together a stack of continuous form paper along one of the folded edges, it is possible to flip through the stack like a book of double-sided printed pages. With this technique, the stack is normally flipped top to bottom or bottom to top rather than side to side.

== History ==
This paper type was developed for use with autographic registers around 1910, was later adopted by tabulating machines beginning in the 1920s, and its use grew with the introduction of commercial computers in the 1950s. IBM cards, preprinted, optionally numbered and pre-punched, were available as continuous form cards and were used for checks and other documents. Continuous form paper became widely used and well known to the general public in the 1980s due to the development of microcomputers and inexpensive dot-matrix consumer printers.

Continuous form paper began to disappear from the consumer market in the 1990s as desktop publishing, and WYSIWYG document generation became more popular and widespread. Consumers were willing to pay more to get a laser printer or inkjet printer that could produce near-typeset-quality documents. These printers accept standard size cut sheets (letter, legal or A4) of paper and do not require continuous form paper. Continuous form paper continues to be used in specialty commercial and industrial markets and, as of 2021, is still available in the US from large retailers of office supplies such as OfficeMax and Staples.

== See also ==
- Film perforations
- Paper size

== Notes and references ==
- Free On-Line Dictionary of Computing
  - Free On-Line Dictionary of Computing
