= Multipart stationery =

Method of producing paper copies

Multipart stationery is paper that is blank, or preprinted as a form to be completed, comprising a stack of several copies, either on carbonless paper or plain paper, interleaved with carbon paper. The stationery may be bound into books with tear-out sheets to be filled in manually, continuous stationery (fanfold sheet or roll) for use in suitable computer printers, or as individual stacks, usually crimped together.

The purpose is to produce multiple simultaneous copies of a document produced by handwriting with a pen that applies pressure, such as a ballpoint pen, or with an impact printer. The pressure of writing or impact printing on the carbon or carbonless paper transfers the content to the copy sheets. Depending upon requirements, up to typically four copies of the original can be made, with the quality and readability decreasing towards the bottom copies. This type of stationery can be used whenever multiple copies are required, of quality adequate for the purpose, usually noticeably inferior to, for example, laser-printed output. Typically a company may need a document such as an invoice to give to a customer (original), with a copy for their own accounting department (first copy), and possibly further copies for other purposes. The paper stock used is typically of low weight—thin—to transfer more printing pressure. The different copies can be on paper of different colour to distinguish them, and preprinted content may vary between copies.
