= Dot matrix printing =

Computer printing process

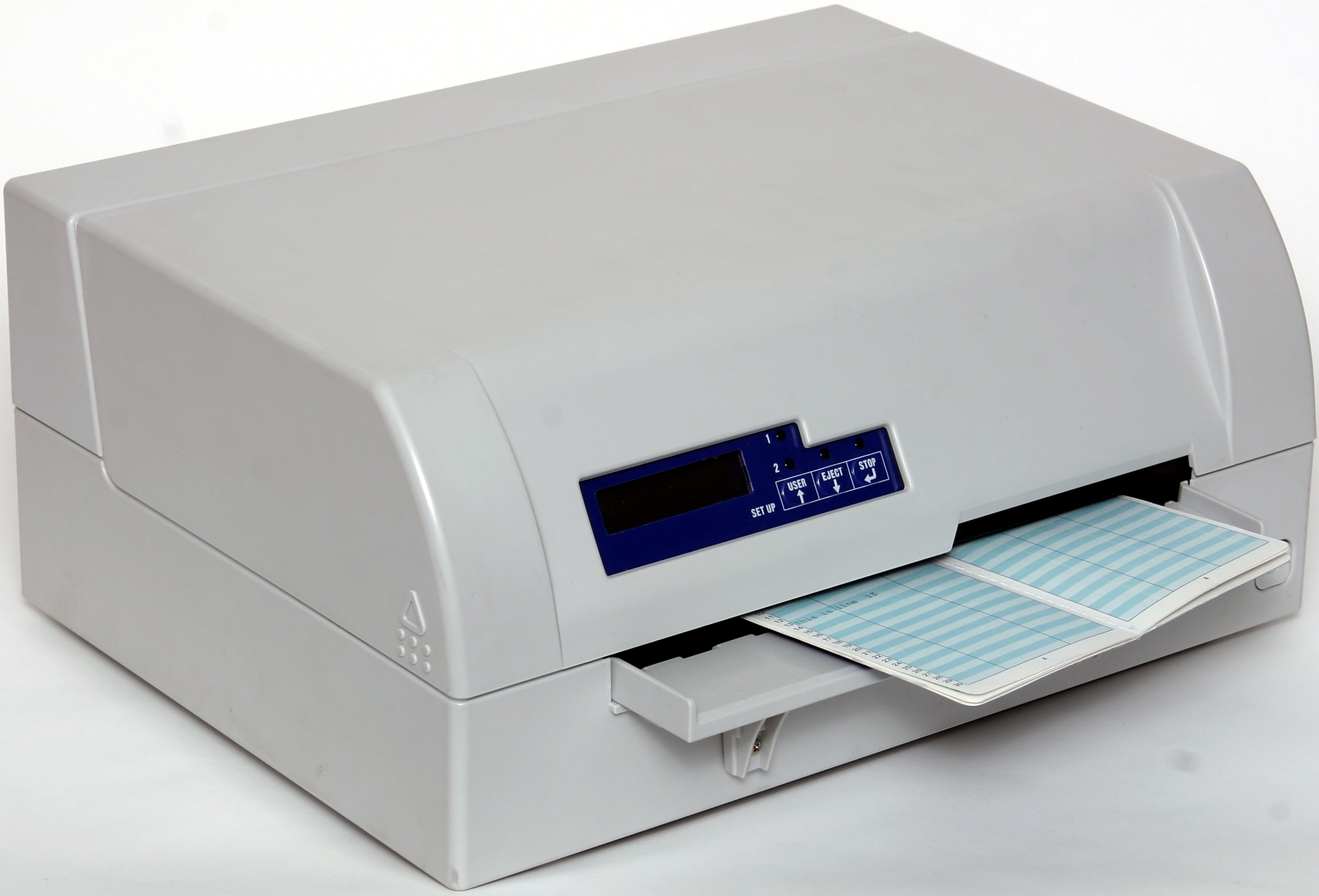
A dot matrix printer

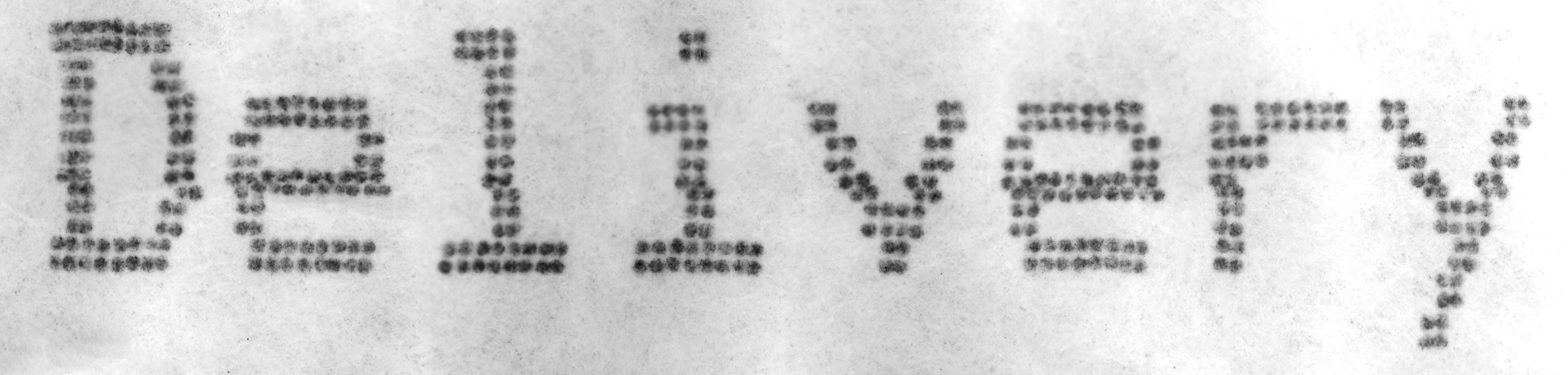
Sample output from a dot matrix printer

Dot matrix printing, sometimes called impact matrix printing, is a computer printing process in which ink is applied to a surface using a relatively low-resolution dot matrix for layout. Dot matrix printers are a type of impact printer that prints using a fixed number of pins or wires and typically use a print head that moves back and forth or in an up-and-down motion on the page and prints by impact, striking an ink-soaked cloth ribbon against the paper. They were also known as serial dot matrix printers. Unlike typewriters or line printers that use a similar print mechanism, a dot matrix printer can print arbitrary patterns and not just specific characters.

The perceived quality of dot matrix printers depends on the vertical and horizontal resolution and the ability of the printer to overlap adjacent dots. 9-pin and 24-pin are common; this specifies the number of pins in a specific vertically aligned space. With 24-pin printers, the horizontal movement can slightly overlap dots, producing visually superior output (near letter-quality or NLQ), usually at the cost of speed.

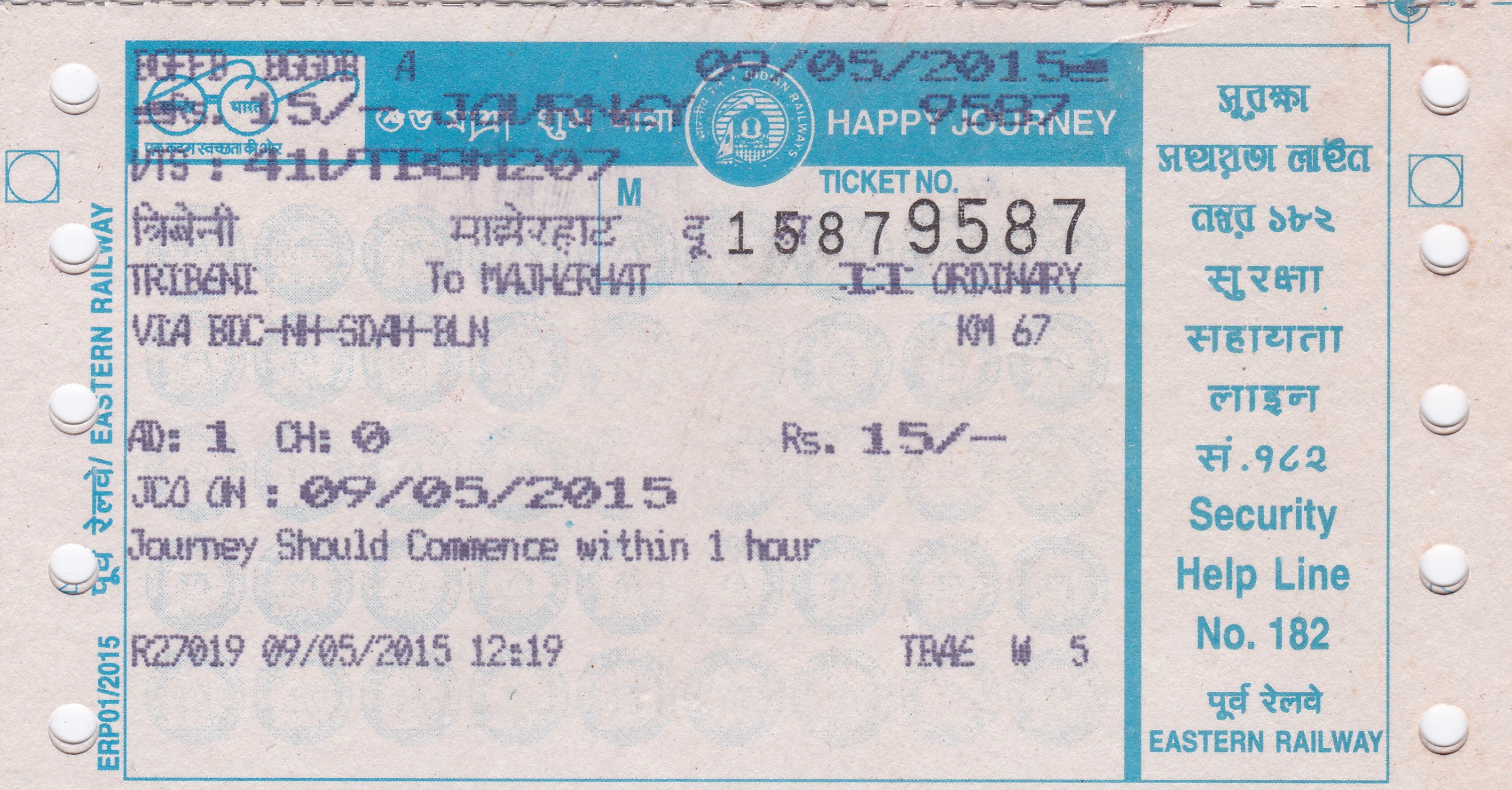
A Kolkata Suburban Railway rail ticket printed by a dot matrix printer

Dot matrix printing is typically distinguished from non-impact methods, such as inkjet, thermal, or laser printing, which also use a bitmap to represent the printed work. These other technologies can support higher dot resolutions and print more quickly, with less noise. Unlike other technologies, impact printers can print on multi-part forms, allowing multiple copies to be made simultaneously, often on paper of different colors. They can also employ endless printing using continuous paper that is fanfolded and perforated so that pages can be easily torn from each other.

== History ==
In 1925, Rudolf Hell invented the Hellschreiber, an early facsimile-like dot matrix–based teletypewriter device, patented in 1929.

Between 1952 and 1954 Fritz Karl Preikschat filed five patent applications for his so-called "PKT printer", a dot matrix teletypewriter built between 1954 and 1956 in Germany. Like the earlier Hellschreiber, it still used electromechanical means of coding and decoding, but it used a start-stop method (asynchronous transmission) rather than synchronous transmission for communication. In 1956, while he was employed at Telefonbau und Normalzeit GmbH (TuN, later called Tenovis), the device was offered to the Deutsche Bundespost (German Post Office), which did not show interest. When Preikschat emigrated to the US in 1957 he sold the rights to utilize the applications in any country (except the USA) to TuN. The prototype was also shown to General Mills in 1957. An improved transistorized design became the basis for a portable dot matrix facsimile machine, which was prototyped and evaluated for military use by Boeing around 1966–1967.

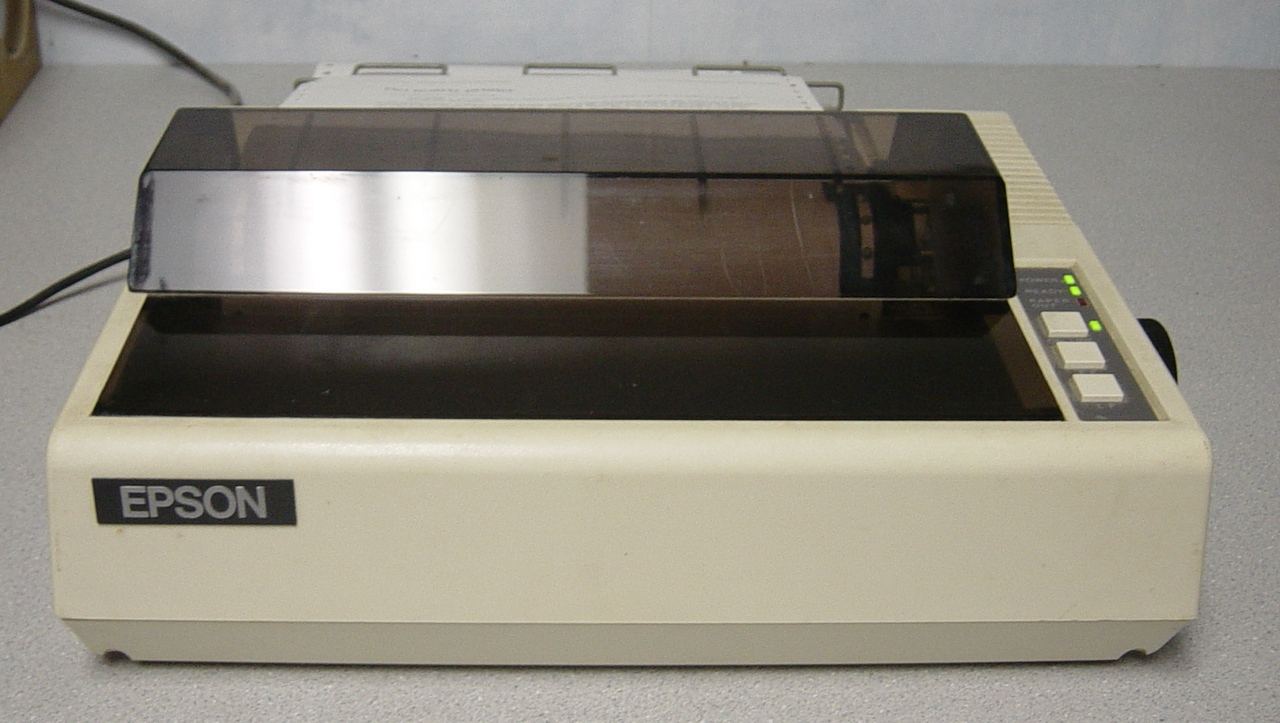
An Epson MX-80, a classic model that remained in use for many years. IBM sold it as their IBM 5152.

In 1968, the Japanese manufacturer OKI introduced its first serial impact dot matrix printer (SIDM), the OKI Wiredot. The printer supported a character generator for 128 characters with a print matrix of 7 × 5. It was aimed at governmental, financial, scientific and educational markets. For this achievement, OKI received an award from the Information Processing Society of Japan (IPSJ) in 2013.

In 1970 Digital Equipment Corporation (DEC) introduced an impact dot matrix printer, the LA30, as did Centronics (then of Hudson, New Hampshire): the Centronics 101. The search for a reliable printer mechanism led it to develop a relationship with Brother Industries, Ltd of Japan, and the sale of Centronics-badged Brother printer mechanisms equipped with a Centronics print head and Centronics electronics. Unlike Digital, Centronics concentrated on the low-end line printer marketplace with their distinctive units. In the process, they designed the parallel electrical interface that was to become standard on most printers until it began to be replaced by the Universal Serial Bus (USB) in the late 1990s.

DEC was a major vendor, albeit with a focus on use with their PDP minicomputer line. Their LA30 30 character/second (CPS) dot matrix printer, the first of many, was introduced in 1970. In the mid-1980s, dot-matrix printers were dropping in price, (Note: "they are costing less all the time. In the budget category, a few new machines stand out...") and began to outsell daisywheel printers, due to their higher speed and versatility. The Apple ImageWriter was a popular consumer dot matrix printer in the 1980s until the mid-1990s.

In the 1970s and 1980s, dot matrix impact printers were generally considered the best combination of cost and versatility, and until the 1990s were by far the most common form of printer used with personal and home computers.

Increased pincount of the printhead from 7, 8, 9 or 12 pins to 18, 24, 27, or 36 permitted superior print quality, which was necessary for success in Asian markets to print legible CJKV characters. Epson's 24-pin LQ-series rose to become the new de facto standard, at 24/180 inch (per pass – 7.5 lpi). Not only could a 24-pin printer lay down a denser dot-pattern in a single pass, it could simultaneously cover a larger area and print more quickly. Although the text quality of a 24-pin was still visibly inferior to a true letter-quality printer such as a daisy wheel or laser printer, print quality was greatly superior to a 9-pin printer. As manufacturing costs declined, 24-pin printers gradually replaced 9-pin printers.

By the dawn of the 1990s, inkjet printers became more common as PC printers.

== Design ==
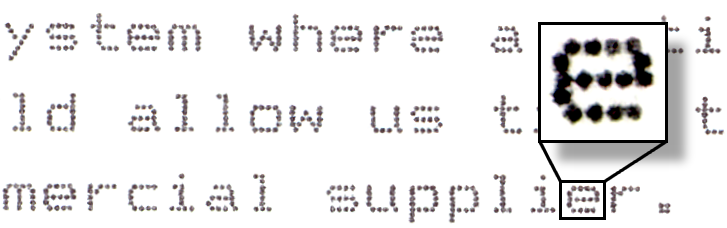
Typical output from a dot matrix printer operating in draft mode. This entire image represents an area of printer output approximately 4.5 cm × 1.5 cm (1.77 in × 0.59 in) in size.

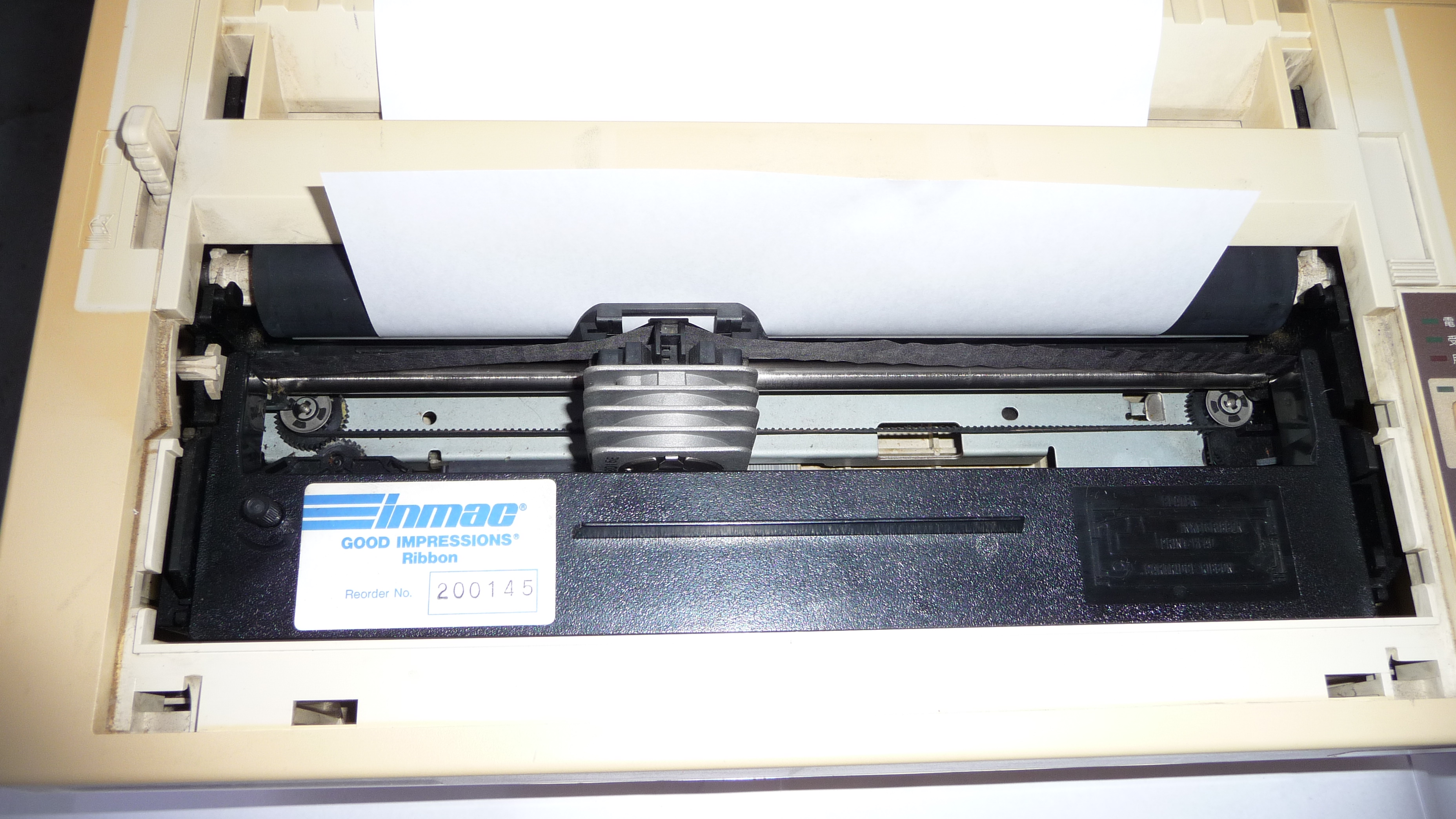
Epson VP-500 Printer with its cover removed

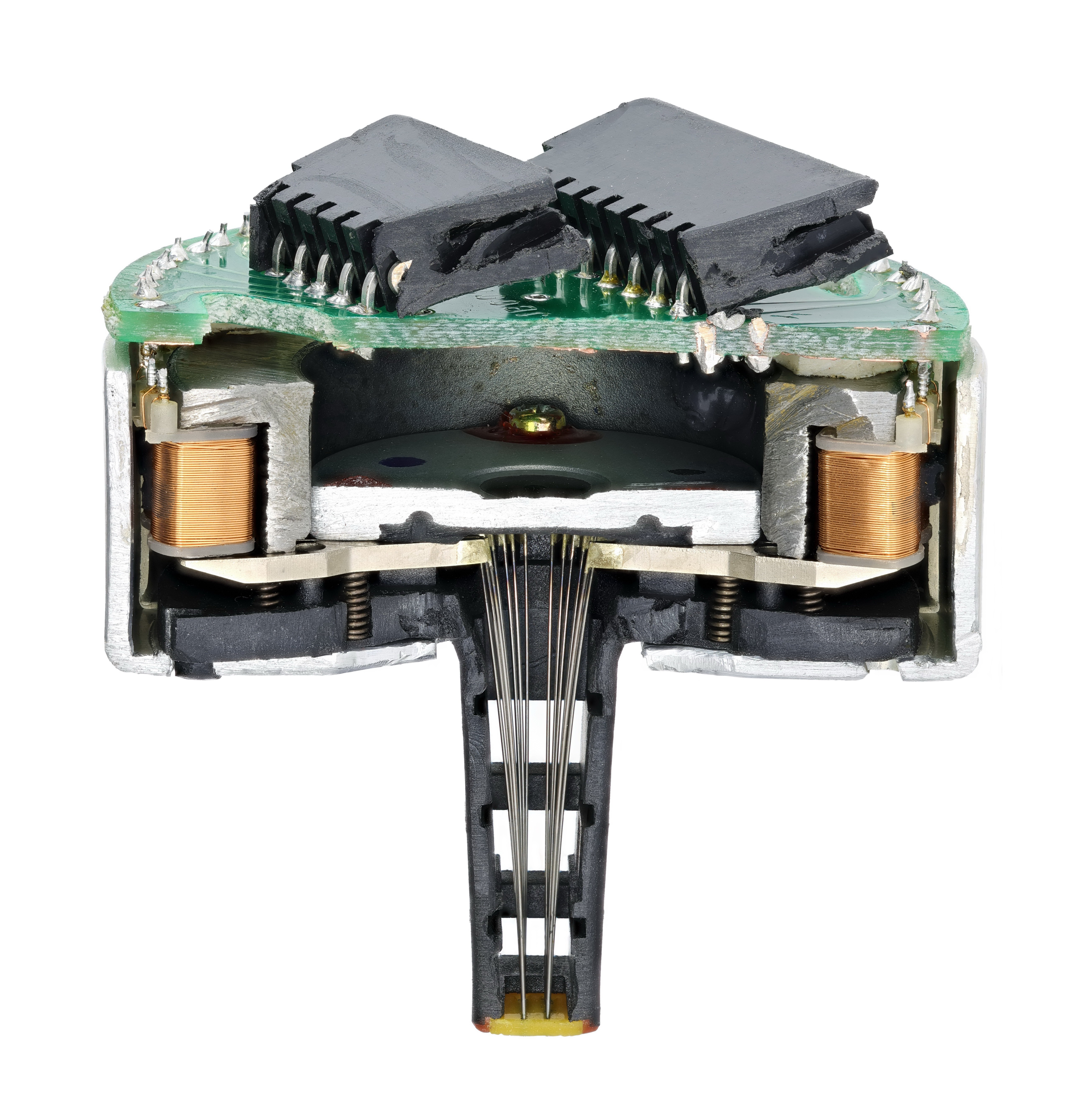
Tally Genicom T2240, 24-Pin printer head cross section. This print head has 24 solenoids at the top arranged radially inside a circular casing. Each solenoid is connected to a lever, which is connected to a long rod, which acts as a pin at the bottom of the print head.

Dot matrix printing uses a print head that moves back-and-forth, or in an up-and-down motion, on the page and prints by impact, striking an ink-soaked cloth ribbon against the paper, much like the print mechanism on a typewriter. However, unlike a typewriter or daisy wheel printer, letters are drawn out of a dot matrix, and thus, varied fonts and arbitrary graphics can be produced.

Each dot is produced by a tiny metal rod, also called a "wire" or "pin", which is driven forward by the power of a tiny electromagnet or solenoid, either directly or through small levers (pawls). Facing the ribbon and the paper is a small guide plate named ribbon mask holder or protector, sometimes also called butterfly for its typical shape. It is pierced with holes to serve as guides for the pins. The plate may be made of hard plastic or an artificial jewel such as sapphire or ruby.

The portion of the printer that contains the pin is called the print head. When running the printer, it generally prints one line of text at a time. The printer head is attached to a metal bar that ensures correct alignment, but horizontal positioning is controlled by a band that attaches to sprockets on two wheels at each side which is then driven with an electric motor. This band may be made of stainless steel, phosphor bronze or beryllium copper alloys, nylon or various synthetic materials with a twisted nylon core to prevent stretching. Actual position can be found out either by dead count using a stepper motor, rotary encoder attached to one wheel, or a transparent plastic band with markings that is read by an optical sensor on the printer head (common on inkjets).

Because the printing involves mechanical pressure, dot matrix printers can create carbon copies and carbonless copies.

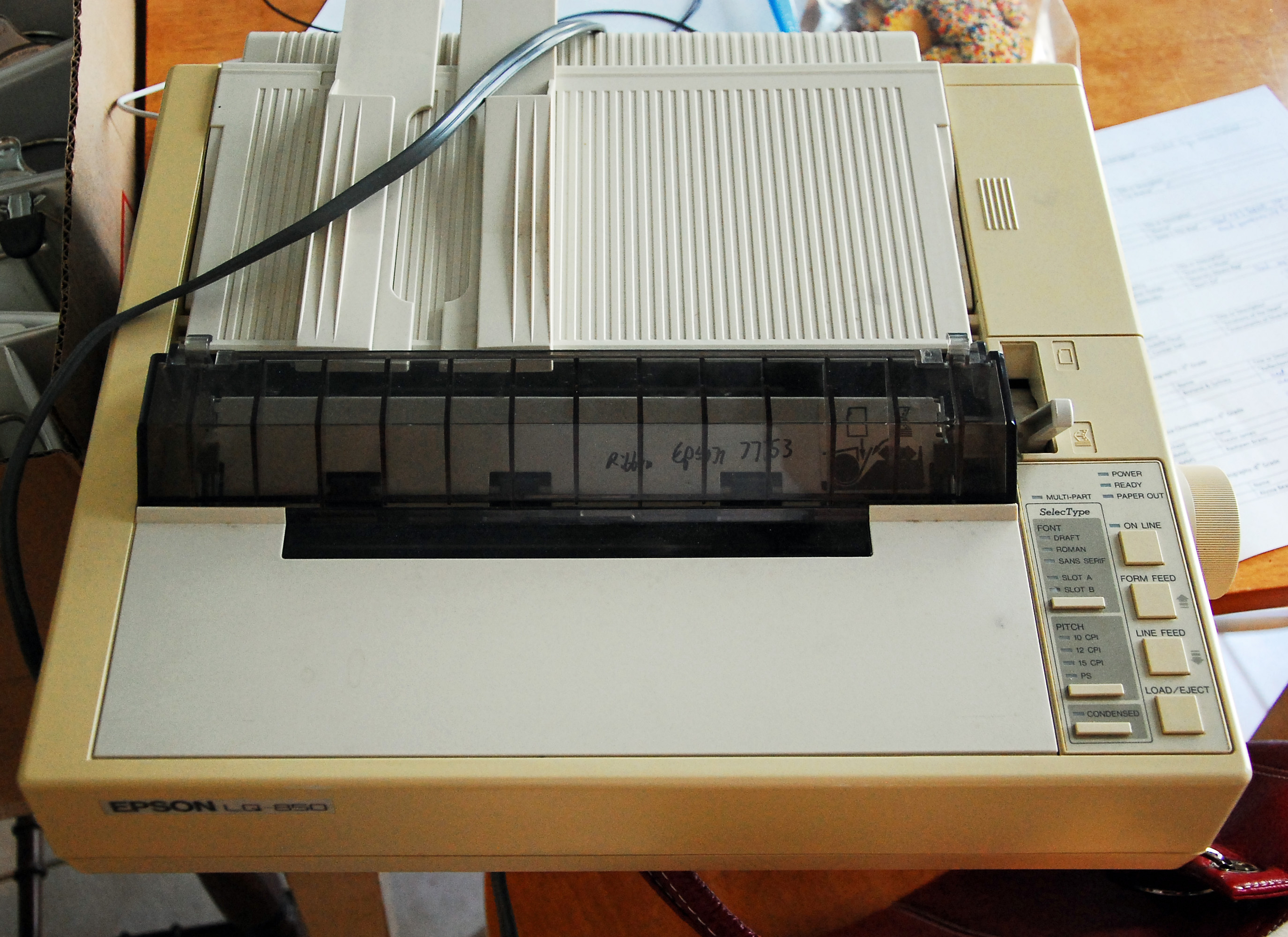
Epson LQ 850

Although nearly all inkjet, thermal, and laser printers also print closely spaced dots rather than continuous lines or characters, it is not customary to call them dot matrix printers.

Dot matrix printers have one of the lowest printing costs per page.

They are able to use fanfold continuous paper with tractor holes.

Dot matrix printers create noise when the pins or typeface strike the ribbon to the paper, and sound-damping enclosures may have to be used in quiet environments.

They can only print lower-resolution graphics, with limited color performance, limited quality, and lower speeds compared to non-impact printers.

== Variations ==
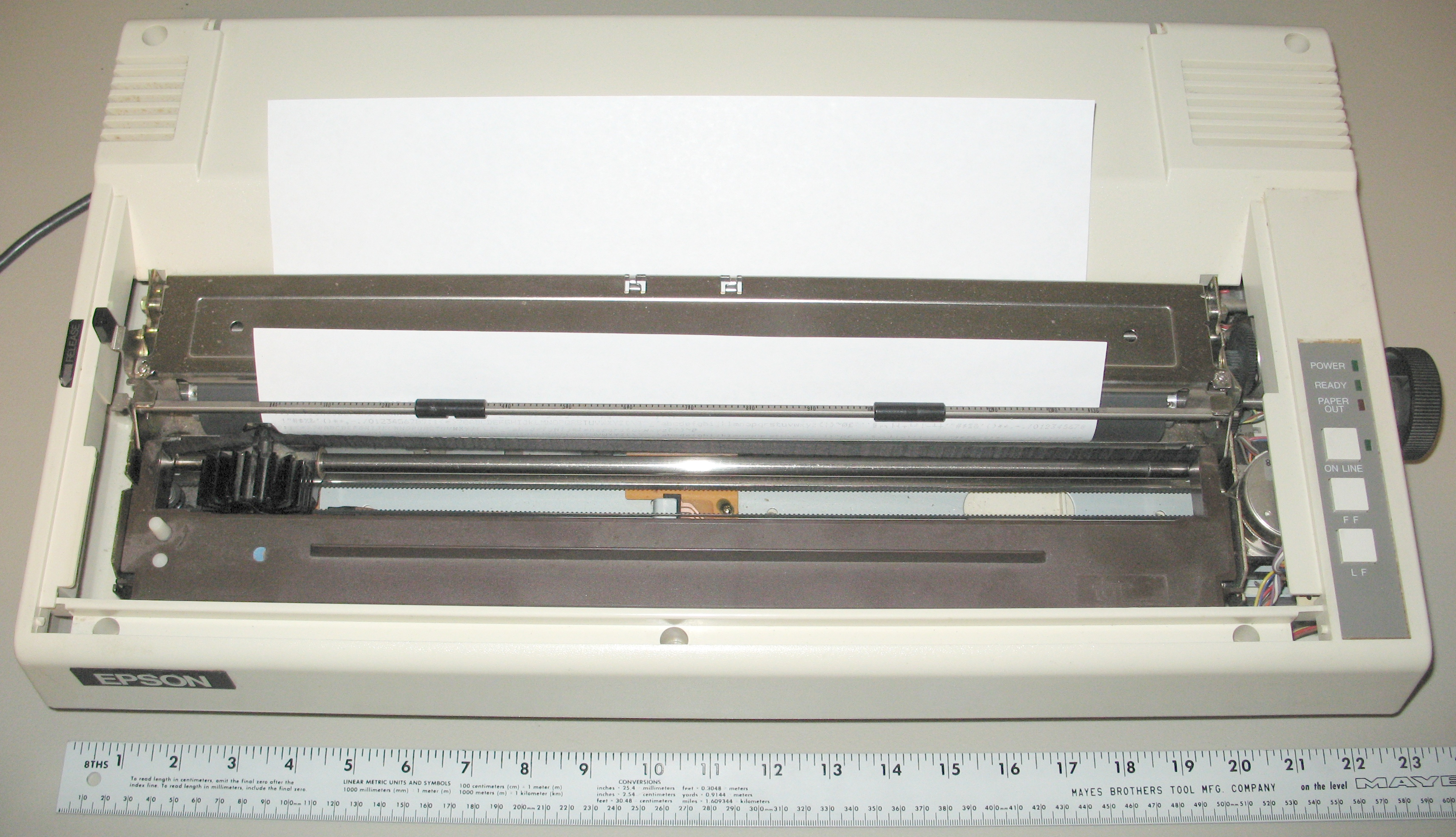
An example of a wide-carriage printer, designed for paper 14 inches wide, shown with legal paper loaded (8.5"×14")

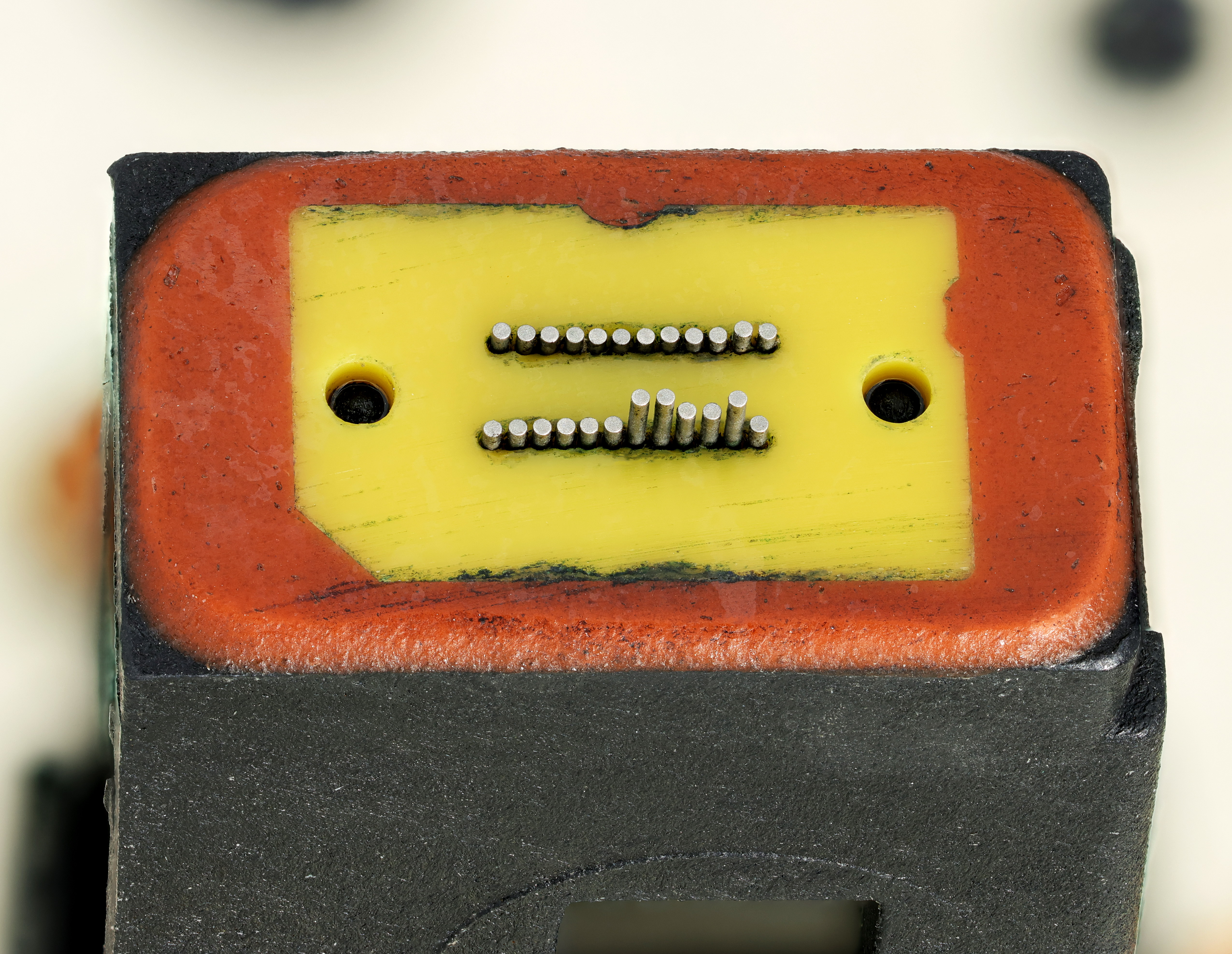
Print head of a 24-pin printer (Tally Genicom T2240)

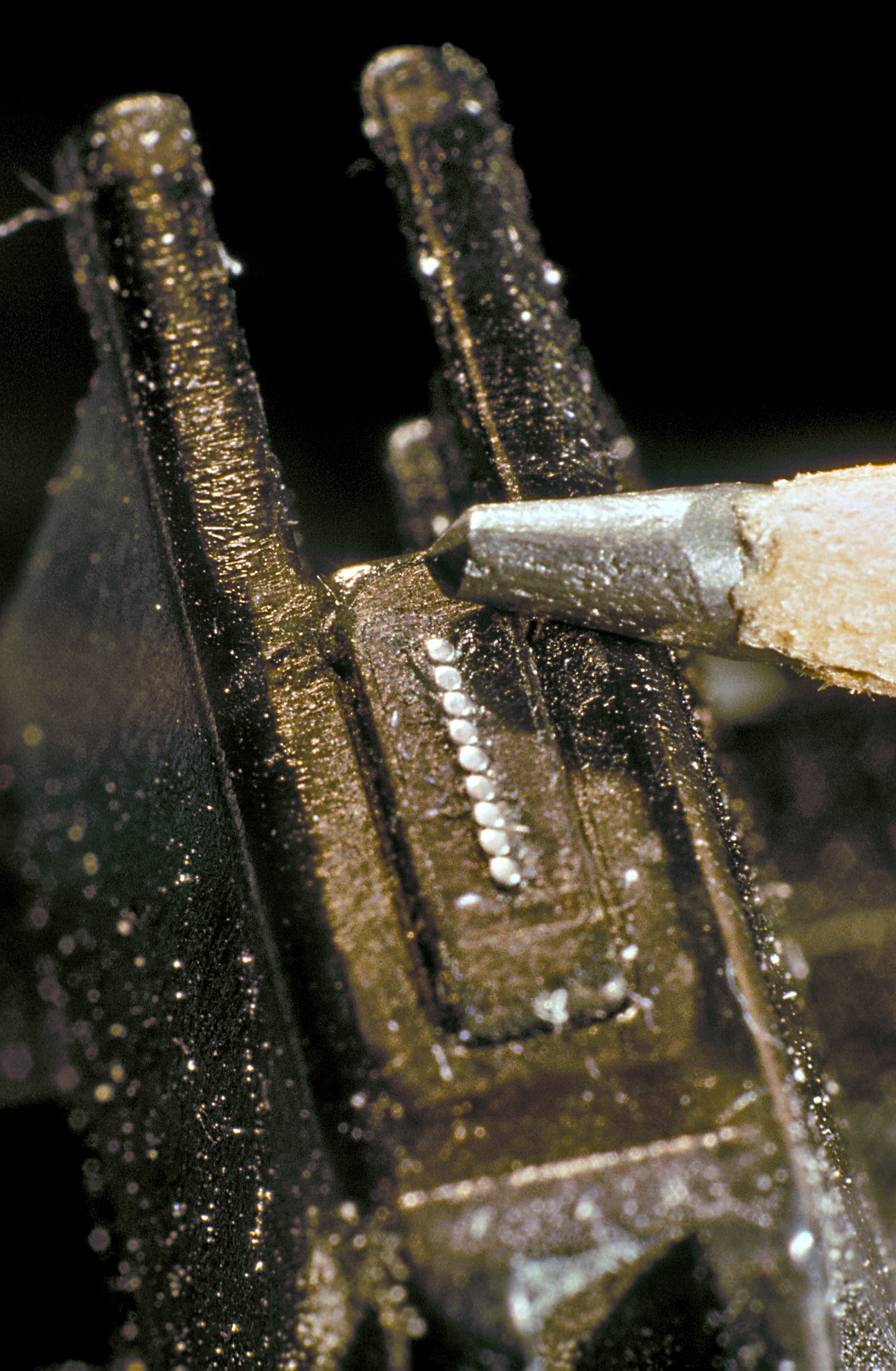
Print head of a 9-pin printer (Star NL10)

The common serial dot matrix printers use a horizontally moving print head. The print head can be thought of featuring a single vertical column of seven or more pins approximately the height of a character box. In reality, the pins are arranged in up to four vertically or/and horizontally slightly displaced columns in order to increase the dot density and print speed through interleaving without causing the pins to jam. Thereby, up to 48 pins can be used to form the characters of a line while the print head moves horizontally. The printing speed of serial dot matrix printers with moving heads varies from 30 to 1550 characters per second (cps).

In a considerably different configuration, so called line dot matrix printers or line matrix printers use a fixed print head almost as wide as the paper path utilizing a horizontal line of thousands of pins for printing. Sometimes two horizontally slightly displaced rows are used to improve the effective dot density through interleaving. While still line-oriented, these printers for the professional heavy-duty market effectively print a whole line at once while the paper moves forward below the print head. Line matrix printers are capable of printing much more than 1000 cps, resulting in a throughput of up to 800 pages per hour.

A variation on the dot matrix printer was the cross hammer dot printer, patented by Seikosha in 1982. The smooth cylindrical roller of a conventional printer was replaced by a spinning, fluted cylinder. The print head was a simple hammer, with a vertical projecting edge, operated by an electromagnet. Where the vertical edge of the hammer intersected the horizontal flute of the cylinder, compressing the paper and ribbon between them, a single dot was marked on the paper. Characters were built up of multiple dots.

== Manufacturers and models ==
=== DEC ===
Unlike the LA30's 80-column, uppercase-only 5 x 7 dot matrix, DEC's product line grew. New models included:

- LA36 (1974): supported upper and lower case, with up to 132 columns of text (also 30 CPS)
- LA34: a lower-cost alternative to the LA36
- LA38: an LA34 with more features
- LA180: 180 CPS
- LS120: 120 CPS
- LA120: 180 CPS (and some advanced features)
- LA12: a portable terminal – the DECwriter Correspondent

==== LA30 ====
The DECwriter LA30 was a 30 character per second dot matrix printing terminal introduced in 1970 by Digital Equipment Corporation (DEC) of Maynard, Massachusetts.

It printed 80 columns of uppercase-only 7 × 5 dot matrix characters across a unique-sized paper. The printhead was driven by a stepper motor and the paper was advanced by a noisy solenoid ratchet drive. The LA30 was available with both a parallel interface (LA30-P) and a serial interface (LA30-S); however, the serial LA30 required the use of fill characters during the carriage-return. In 1972, a receive-only variation named LA30A became available.

==== LA36 ====
The LA30 was followed in 1974 by the LA36, which achieved far greater commercial success, becoming for a time the standard dot matrix computer terminal. The LA36 used the same print head as the LA30 but could print on forms of any width up to 132 columns of mixed-case output on standard green bar fanfold paper. The carriage was moved by a much-more-capable servo drive using a DC electric motor and an optical encoder / tachometer. The paper was moved by a stepper motor. The LA36 was only available with a serial interface but unlike the earlier LA30, no fill characters were required. This was possible because, while the printer never communicated at faster than 30 characters per second, the mechanism was actually capable of printing at 60 characters per second. During the carriage return period, characters were buffered for subsequent printing at full speed during a catch-up period. The two-tone buzz produced by 60-character-per-second catch-up printing followed by 30-character-per-second ordinary printing was a distinctive feature of the LA36, quickly copied by many other manufacturers well into the 1990s. Most efficient dot matrix printers used this buffering technique.

Digital technology later broadened the basic LA36 line into a wide variety of dot matrix printers.

==== LA50 ====
The DEC LA50 was designed to be a "compact, dot matrix" printer. When in graphic mode (as opposed to text mode), the printhead can generate graphic images. When in (bitmap) graphics mode, the LA50 can receive and print Sixel (Note: short for "six pixels:" a pattern six pixels high and one wide, resulting in 64 possible patterns.) graphics format.

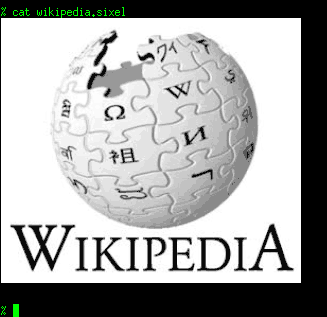
The Wikipedia logo, converted to Sixel format

=== Centronics 101 ===
The Centronics 101 (introduced 1970) was highly innovative and affordable at its inception. Some selected specifications:

- Print speed: 165 characters per second
- Weight: 155 pounds (70.3 kg)
- Size: 27 ½" W x 11 ¼" H x 19 ¼ D (approx. 70 cm x 29 cm x 49 cm)
- Shipping: 200 pounds (approx. 91 kg), wooden crate, unpacked by removal of 36 screws
- Characters: 62: 10 numeric, 26 upper case, and 26 special characters (no lower case)
- Character size: 10 characters per inch (10 "pitch")
- Line spacing: 6 lines per inch (6 LPI)
- Vertical control: punched tape reader for top of form and vertical tab
- Forms thickness: original plus four copies
- Interfaces: Centronics parallel, optional RS-232 serial

=== IBM 5103 ===
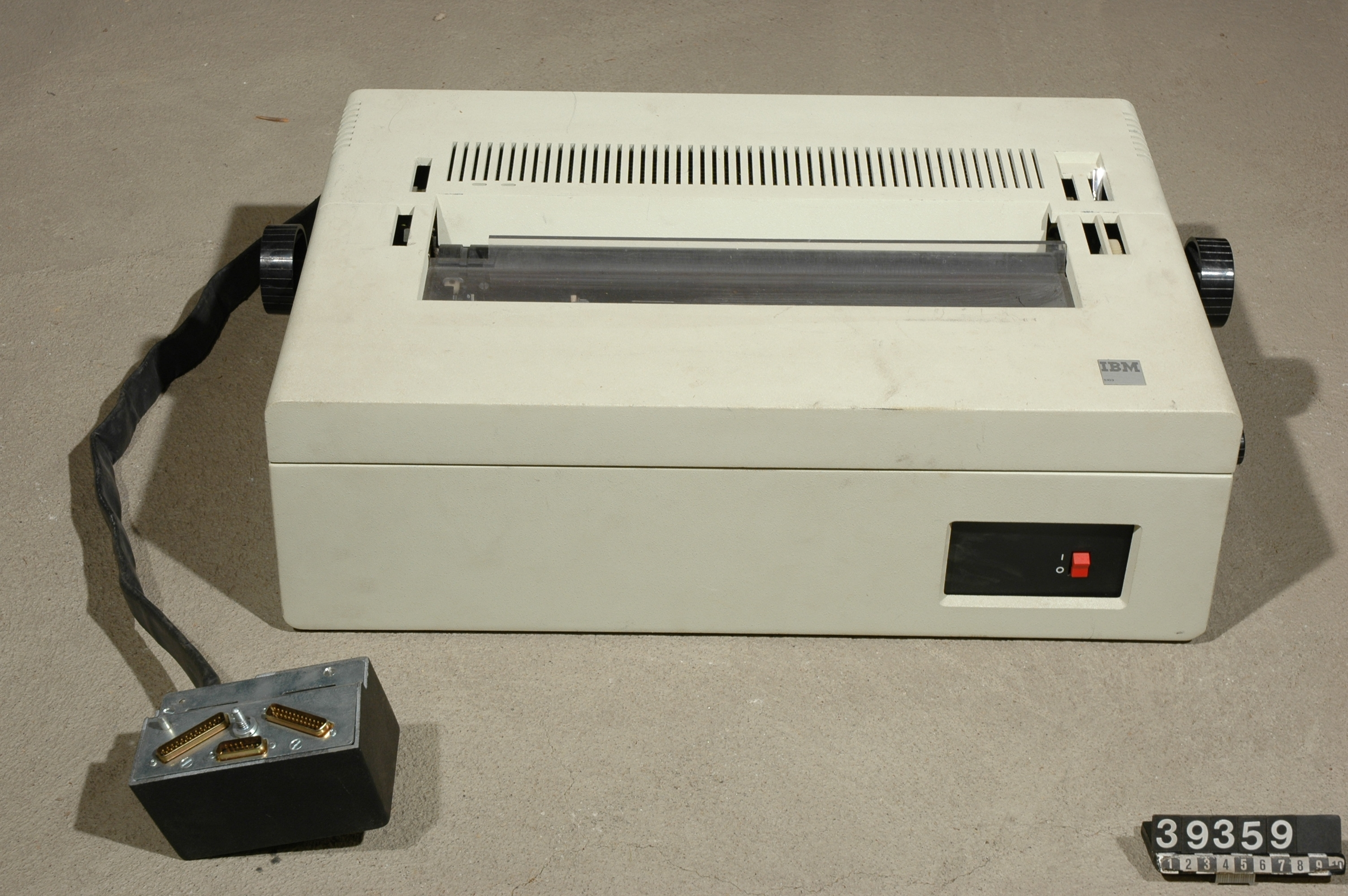
IBM 5103 printer in Tekniska museet, Stockholm, Sweden

The IBM 5103 was the only IBM printer that could be attached to the IBM 5100, an early day portable computer. Printing was 8 DPI, 10 pitch, 6 LPI, and capable of printing bidirectionally from a 128-character set. Two models were offered: 80 and 120 characters per second.

==== Near Letter Quality (NLQ) ====
Near Letter Quality mode — informally specified as almost good enough to be used in a business letter — endowed dot-matrix printers with a simulated typewriter-like quality. By using multiple passes of the carriage, and higher dot density, the printer could increase the effective resolution. In 1985, The New York Times described the use of "near letter-quality, or NLQ" as "just a neat little bit of hype" but acknowledged that they "really show their stuff in the area of fonts, print enhancements and graphics".

NLQ printers could generally be set to print in "draft mode", in which case a single pass of the print head per line would be used. This produced lower-quality print at much higher output speed.

== PC usage ==
In 1985, PC Magazine wrote "for the average personal computer user dot matrix remains the most workable choice". At the time, IBM sold Epson's MX-80 as their IBM 5152.

=== Personal computers ===
In June 1978, the Epson TX-80/TP-80, an 8-pin dot-matrix printer mainly used for the Commodore PET computer, was released. This and its successor, the 9-pin MX-80/MP-80 (introduced in 1979–1980), sparked the popularity of impact printers in the personal computer market. The MX-80 combined affordability with good-quality text output (for its time). Early impact printers (including the MX) were notoriously loud during operation, a result of the hammer-like mechanism in the print head. The MX-80's low dot density (60 dpi horizontal, 72 dpi vertical) produced printouts of a distinctive "computerized" quality. When compared to the crisp typewriter quality of a daisy-wheel printer, the dot-matrix printer's legibility appeared especially bad. In office applications, output quality was a serious issue, as the dot-matrix text's readability would rapidly degrade with each photocopy generation.

==== PC software ====
Initially, third-party printer enhancement software offered a quick fix to the quality issue. General strategies were:

- doublestrike (print each line twice), and
- double-density mode (slow the print head to allow denser and more precise dot placement).

Some newer dot-matrix impact printers could reproduce bitmap images via "dot-addressable" capability. In 1981, Epson offered a retrofit EPROM kit called Graftrax to add this to many early MX series printers. Banners and signs produced with software that used this ability, such as Broderbund's Print Shop, became ubiquitous in offices and schools throughout the 1980s.

As carriage speed increased and dot density increased (from 60 dpi up to 240 dpi), with some adding color printing, additional typefaces allowed the user to vary the text appearance of printouts. Proportional-spaced fonts allowed the printer to imitate the non-uniform character widths of a typesetter, and also darker printouts. 'User-downloadable fonts' gave until the printer was powered off or soft-reset. The user could embed up to two NLQ custom typefaces in addition to the printer's built-in (ROM) typefaces.

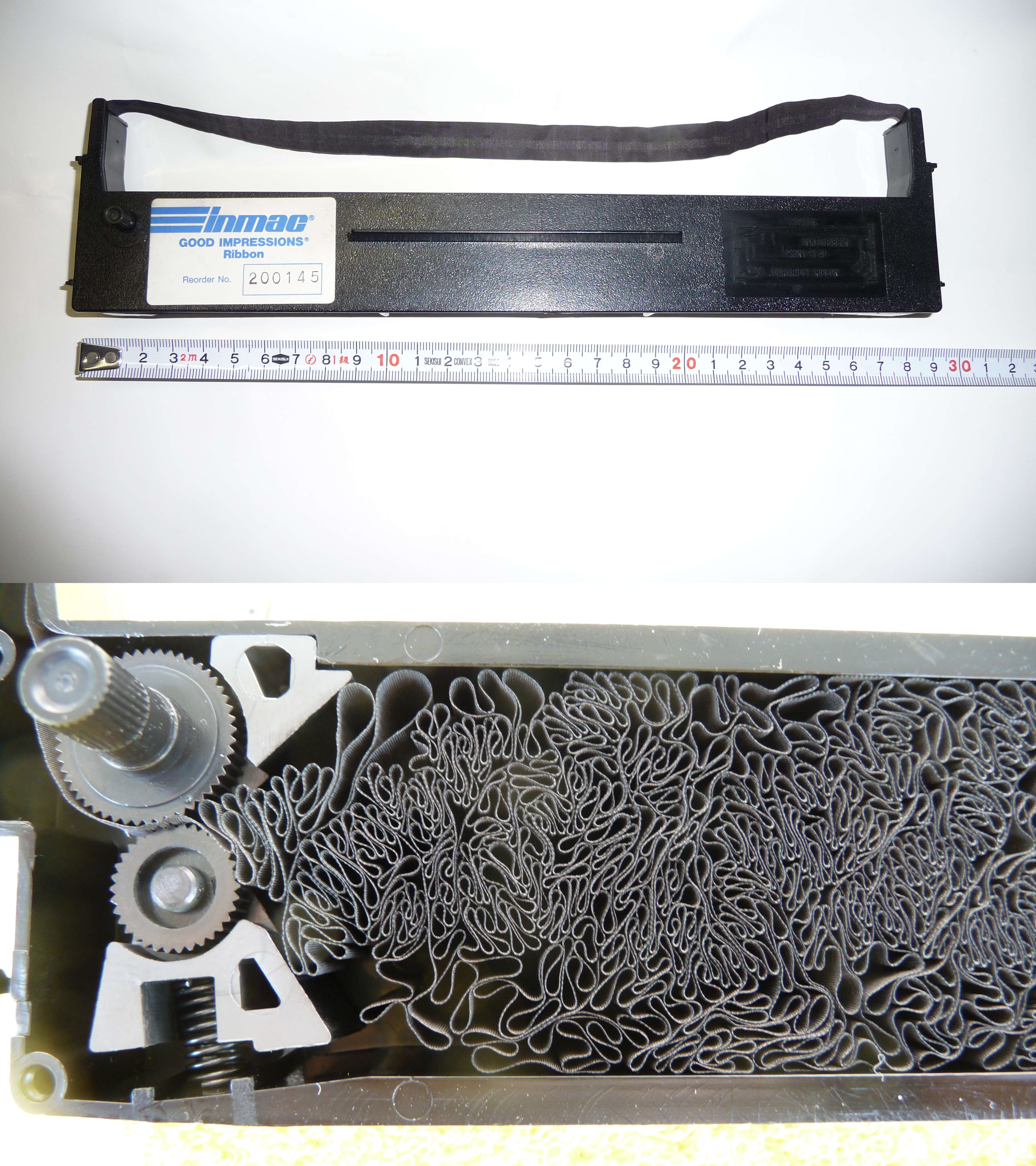
Upper: Inmac ink ribbon cartridge with black ink for a dot matrix printer. Lower: Inked and folded, the ribbon is pushed back into the cartridge by the roller mechanism to the left.

=== Contemporary use ===
The desktop impact printer was gradually replaced by the inkjet printer. When Hewlett-Packard's US patent 4578687 expired on steam-propelled photolithographically produced inkjet heads in 2004, the inkjet mechanism became available to the printer industry. For applications that did not require impact (e.g. carbon-copy printing), the inkjet was superior in nearly all respects: comparatively quiet operation, faster print speed, and output quality almost as good as a laser printer. By 1995, inkjet printing had surpassed dot matrix impact technology in the mainstream market and relegated dot matrix to niche applications.

As of 2021, dot matrix impact technology remains in use in devices and applications such as:

- Cash registers,
- ATMs,
- Banking, passbook and cashier's checks,
- Time cards and parking stubs,
- Multi-part contracts for signature,
- Fire alarm systems,
- Point-of-sale terminals,
- British and Irish fire stations for turnout sheets,
- Applications requiring continuous output on fan-fold paper.

Thermal printing is gradually supplanting them in some of these applications, but full-size dot-matrix impact printers are still used to print multi-part stationery. For example, dot matrix impact printers are still used at bank tellers and auto repair shops, and other applications where use of tractor feed paper is desirable such as data logging and aviation. Most of these printers now come with USB interfaces as a standard feature to facilitate connections to modern computers without legacy ports.

== See also ==
- Daisy wheel printing
- ESC/P
- Dye-sublimation printer
- IBM Proprinter
- Typeball printer
