= Carbon copy =

Copy of a document made by carbon paper

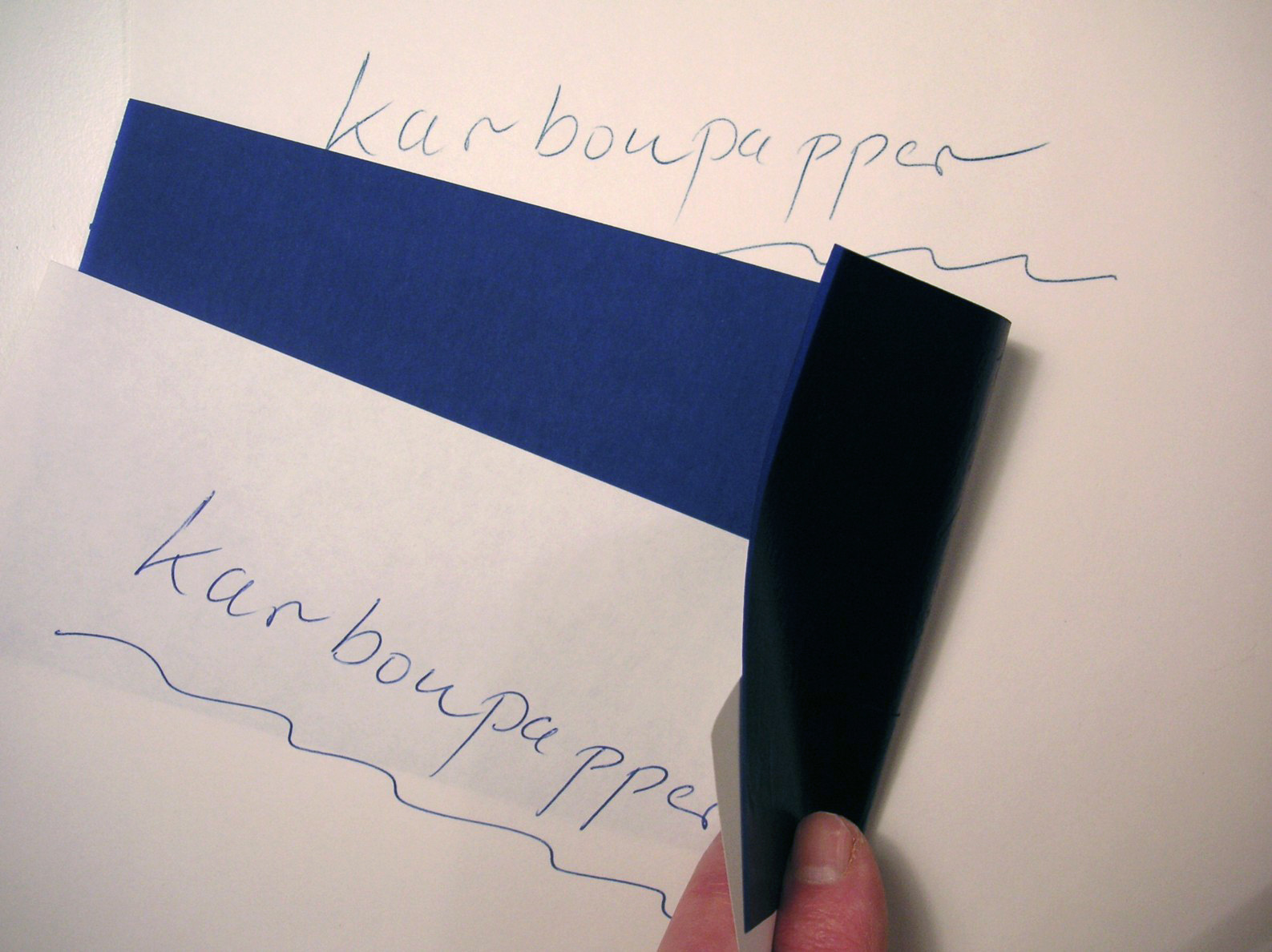
A copy made with carbon paper

A carbon copy is a method of document copying where the original document is placed over a sheet of carbon paper and a blank sheet, then pressure is applied on the original document, so the document is printed on the blank sheet with carbon.

When copies of business letters were so produced, it was customary to use the acronym "CC" or "cc" before a colon and below the writer's signature to inform the principal recipient that carbon copies had been made and distributed to the parties listed after the colon. With the advent of word processors and e-mail, "cc" is used as a merely formal indication of the distribution of letters to secondary recipients.

== Process ==
A sheet of carbon paper is placed between two or more sheets of paper. Later, pressure is applied to the top sheet with a writing implement such as a pen, pencil, typewriter or impact printer. This causes pigment from the carbon paper to reproduce the similar mark on the copy sheet(s). More than one copy can be made by stacking several sheets with carbon paper between each pair. Four or five copies is a practical limit. The top sheet is the original and each of the additional sheets is called a carbon copy.

== History ==
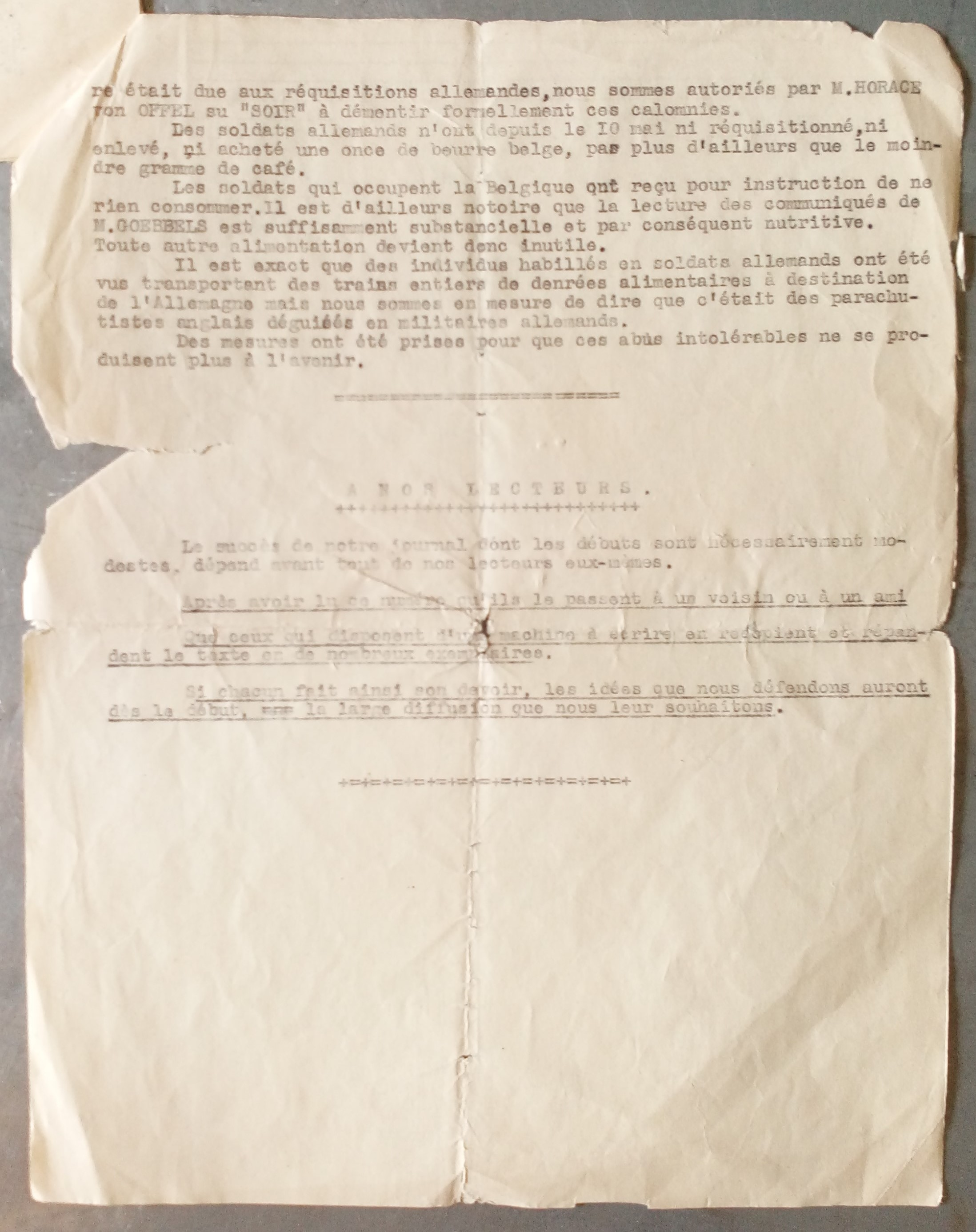
As creating carbon copies requires relatively few resources, it became a common method for producing underground and clandestine newspapers, as seen in this French example from World War II.

Carbon paper was invented by Pellegrino Turri in 1801, but it did not become widely used for copying until typewriters became common. Carbon copies were in wide use between the 1870s and 1980s, largely for administrative tasks.

== Use ==
The use of carbon copies declined with the advent of photocopying and electronic document creation and distribution (word processing). Carbon copies are still sometimes used in special applications: for example, in manual receipt books which have a multiple-use sheet of carbon paper supplied, so that the user can keep an exact copy of each receipt issued, although even here carbonless copy paper is often used to the same effect.

It is still common for a business letter to include, at the end, a list of names preceded by the abbreviation "CC", indicating that the named persons are to receive copies of the letter, even though carbon paper is no longer used to make the copies.

An alternative etymology is that "c:" was used for copy and "cc:" indicates the plural, just as "p." means page and "pp." means pages, although dictionaries such as the OED cite only "carbon copy" in the earliest known attestation of the abbreviation, dated 1936. This alternative etymology explains the frequent usage of "c:" when only one recipient is listed, while "cc:" is used for two or more recipients of the copies. This etymology can also explain why, even originally, "cc:" was used to list recipients who received typed copies and not necessarily carbon copies. Sometimes this "cc" is interpreted as "courtesy copy".

=== Figurative use ===
The term "carbon copy" can denote anything that is a near duplicate of an original ("...and you want to turn him into a carbon copy of every fourth-rate conformist in this frightened land!" Robert Heinlein, Stranger in a Strange Land).

=== Use as a verb ===
Carbon copy can be used as a transitive verb with the meaning described under e-mail below related to the CC field of an e-mail message. That is, to send the message to additional recipients beyond the primary recipient. It is common practice to abbreviate the verb form, and many forms are used, including cc and cc:. Past tense forms in use are CCed, cc'd, cc'ed, cc-ed and cc:'d. Present participle or imperfect forms in use include cc'ing. Merriam-Webster uses cc, cc'd and cc'ing, respectively.

== Printers ==
Impact printers, such as dot matrix and daisy wheel impact printers, are also able to use carbon paper to produce several copies of a document in one pass. Commercial-grade models can print on six-part forms, while less powerful, low-cost ones may print up to three-part forms. Usually, this feature is used in conjunction with continuous, prearranged perforated paper and carbon supplies for use with a tractor feeder, rather than with single sheets of paper, for example, when printing out commercial invoices or receipts.

== Examples ==
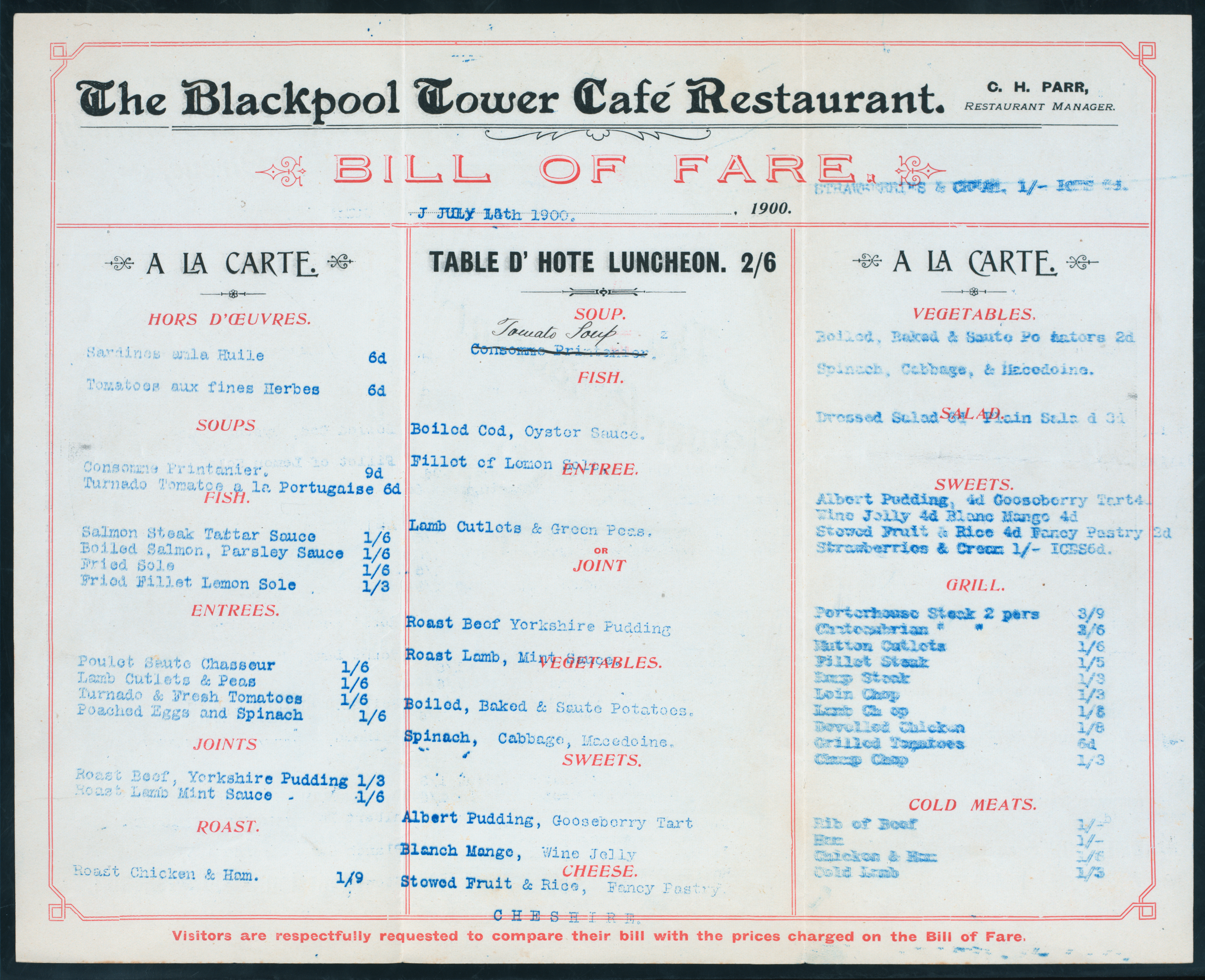
Menu for the Blackpool Tower Café Restaurant, with daily specials (in blue) carbon copied, early 20th century.

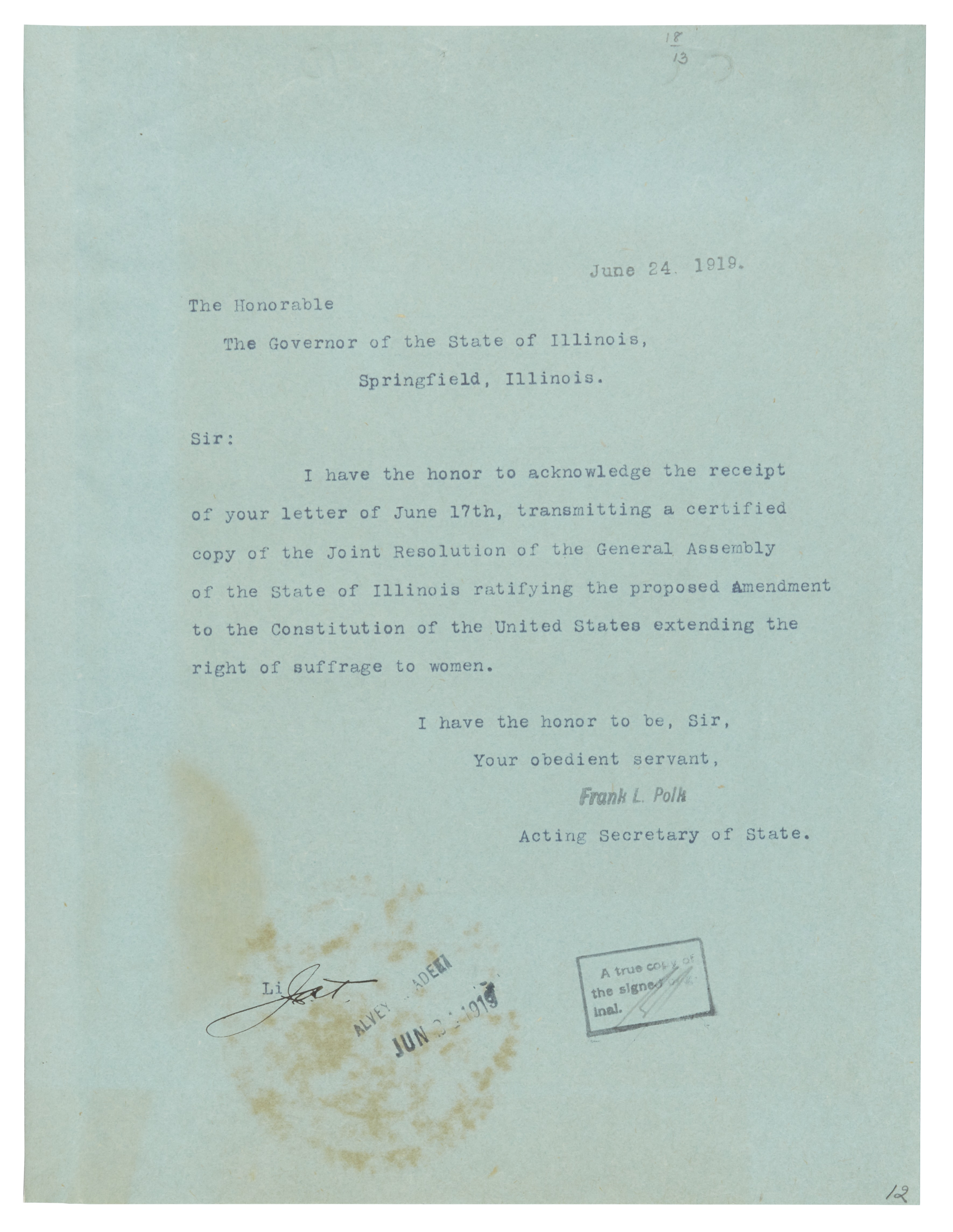
Typed carbon copy letter from 1919, with stamp reading "A true copy of the signed original."
