= Diisopropylnaphthalenes =

Group of chemical compounds

Identifiers
CAS Number	38640-62-9
EC Number	254-052-6
UNII	V970U16PQR

Properties
Chemical formula	C_{16}H_{20}
Molar mass	212.336 g·mol^{−1}
Density	0.96 g/cm^{3}
Melting point	38 °C (100 °F; 311 K)
Boiling point	290–299 °C (554–570 °F; 563–572 K)
- Except where otherwise noted, data are given for materials in their standard state (at 25 °C [77 °F], 100 kPa). Infobox references

Diisopropylnaphthalenes (DIPN) is a solvent used in carbonless copy paper. The oil consists of a mixture of constitutional isomers having two isopropyl groups at various locations on a naphthalene core. Some key properties are broad liquid range, low volatility, and low toxicity. DIPN is also known as Kureha Micro Capsule Oil (KMC oil).

One component of DIPN is 2,6-diisopropylnaphthalene, which has more specialized applications.
