= Autographic Register =

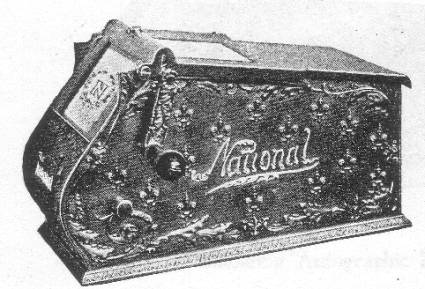
Autographic Register - National Cash Register Company, 1898

An Autographic Register is a business machine invented in 1883 by James C. Shoup. The device consisted of two separate rolls of paper interleaved with carbon paper. Usually one or both of the rolls would be preprinted with form information. To operate the machine the user would write, for example, a sales receipt and the machine automatically produced a copy. The crank on the machine ejected the records and moved a blank form into view. The original receipt produced would go to the user and the copy was filed. Shoup founded the Autographic Register Company in Hoboken, New Jersey to manufacture his invention.

The Autographic Register was an advance over use of separate forms and carbon paper as it guaranteed that the copy was made and kept the forms in relative alignment. A number of advancements were soon made, including the use of sprocket-fed paper, invented by Theodore Schirmer. This helped avoid slippage and misalignment of forms, allowing more copies to be produced simultaneously. In 1912, Schirmer founded the Standard Register Company in Dayton, Ohio.

The invention of sprocket-fed paper later found use in computer printers.

Although the Autographic Register has been largely replaced by newer technology it remains in use as of 2015.
