= James C. Shoup =

American lawyer and inventor

James Conwell Shoup (died August 14, 1898) was a lawyer and inventor who served as a state senator in Mississippi.

Shoup served in the Confederate Army. After the Civil War, he moved to Mississippi from Ohio and became a Republican. In 1870 he served in the Mississippi Senate representing the 27th district. In July 1870 accepted an appointment as a District Attorney. After his vacancy was filled, Shoup made a failed effort in 1871 to reclaim his senate seat stating he did not resign which caused controversy. In March 1871, he was also removed as District Attorney. Shortly after he moved to St. Louis, Missouri.

While in St. Louis, he continued to practice law and was involved in politics.

In 1883, Shoup invented the Autographic Register and founded the Autographic Register Company in Hoboken, New Jersey. He was married to Henrietta and had three sons and two daughters. He died on August 14, 1898.

== See also ==
- Shoup's Mountain Battery
