= Carbonless copy paper =

Type of coated paper used to make instant copies without carbon paper

Carbonless copy paper. Example showing a two-copy process (the purple and yellow layers).

Carbonless copy paper (CCP), also called non-carbon copy paper or NCR paper (which stands for "no carbon required", a backronym derived from its creator National Cash Register), is a type of coated paper designed to transfer information written on the top sheet to the sheets beneath. It was developed by chemists Lowell Schleicher and Barry Green, as an alternative to carbon paper and is sometimes misidentified as such.

Carbonless copying provides an alternative to the use of carbon copying. Carbonless copy paper has micro-encapsulated dye or ink on the back side of the top sheet, and a clay coating on the front side of the bottom sheet. When pressure is applied (from writing or impact printing), the dye capsules rupture and react with the clay to duplicate the markings made to the top sheet. Intermediary sheets, with clay on the front and dye capsules on the back, can be used to create multiple copies; this may be referred to as multipart stationery.

== Operation ==
Carbonless copy paper consists of sheets of paper that are coated with micro-encapsulated dye or ink or a reactive clay. The back of the first sheet is coated with micro-encapsulated dye (referred to as a Coated Back or CB sheet). The lowermost sheet is coated on the top surface with a clay that quickly reacts with the dye to form a permanent mark (Coated Front, CF). Any intermediate sheets are coated with clay on top and dye on the bottom (Coated Front and Back, CFB).

When the sheets are written on with pressure (e.g., ball-point pen) or impact (e.g., typewriter, dot-matrix printer), the pressure causes the micro-capsules to break and release their dye. Since the capsules are so small, the resulting print is very accurate.

Carbonless copy paper is also available in a self-contained version that has both the ink and the clay on the same side of the paper.

== Uses ==
The NCR Corporation first produced carbonless copy paper and applied for a patent on June 30, 1953. Previously, to create duplicates, one had to either rewrite documents manually or use carbon paper placed between the original sheet and the copy. Carbonless paper was used as business stationery requiring one or more copies of the original, such as invoices and receipts. The copies were often paper of different colors (e.g., white original for customer, yellow copy for supplier's records, and other colors for subsequent copies). Stationery with carbonless copy paper can be supplied collated either in pads or books bound into sets, or as loose sets, or as continuous stationery for printers designed to use it.

== Dyes and chemicals ==
The first dye used commercially in this application was crystal violet lactone, which remains widely used. Other dyes and supporting chemicals used are PTSMH (p-toluene sulfinate of Michler's hydrol), TMA (trimellitic anhydride), phenol-formaldehyde resins, azo dyes, DIPN (diisopropylnaphthalenes), formaldehyde isocyanates, hydrocarbon-based solvents, polycyclic aromatic hydrocarbons, polyoxypropylene diamine, epoxy resins, aliphatic isocyanates, bisphenol A, diethylene triamine, and others. The dyes in carbonless copy papers may cause contact dermatitis in sensitive individuals.

== Health and environmental concerns ==
Until the 1970s, when the use of polychlorinated biphenyls (PCBs) was banned due to health and environmental concerns, PCBs were used as a transfer agent in carbonless copy paper. PCBs are readily transferred to human skin during handling of such papers, and it is difficult to achieve decontamination by ordinary washing with soap and water. As of 2003, carbonless copy paper (CCP) in Japan was classified as PCB-contaminated waste. This classification stemmed from the historical use of polychlorinated biphenyls (PCBs) in CCP production. In 2001, Japan enacted the "Law Concerning Special Measures against PCB Waste", mandating the destruction of PCB-contaminated wastes by July 14, 2016.

Exposure to certain types of carbonless copy paper or its components has resulted, under some conditions, in mild to moderate symptoms of skin irritation and irritation of the mucosal membranes of the eyes and upper respiratory tract. A 2000 review found no irritation or sensitization on contact with carbonless copy paper produced after 1987. In most cases, good industrial hygiene and work practices should be adequate to reduce or eliminate symptoms. These include adequate ventilation, humidity, and temperature controls; proper housekeeping; minimal hand-to-mouth and hand-to-eye contact; and periodic cleansing of hands.

In a 1997 study, the University of Florida found that a poorly ventilated office where large amounts of carbonless copy paper were used had significant levels of volatile organic compounds present in its air, whereas a well ventilated office where little such paper was used did not. The study also found that there were higher rates of sick leave and illness complaints at the office using large amounts of carbonless copy paper. Another study, which was published in Environmental Health Perspectives, connected chronic occupational exposure to paper dust and carbonless copy paper with an increased risk of adult-onset asthma.

The average carbonless copy paper contains a high concentration of bisphenol A (BPA), an endocrine disruptor.

In 2001, three employees of a medical center in San Francisco filed a lawsuit against their employer, blaming exposure to carbonless copy paper and other chemicals for their inflammatory breast cancer.

The widespread adoption of affordable inkjet and laser printers since the 1980s has led to a decline in the use of carbonless multipart forms in businesses, as these modern printers facilitate easier document duplication. Additionally, the rise of digital technologies and electronic documentation has reduced reliance on physical paper forms.

== See also ==
- Carbon copy
- Carbon paper
- Spirit duplicator AKA Ditto machine
- List of duplicating processes
