= Carbon paper =

Paper used to make copies

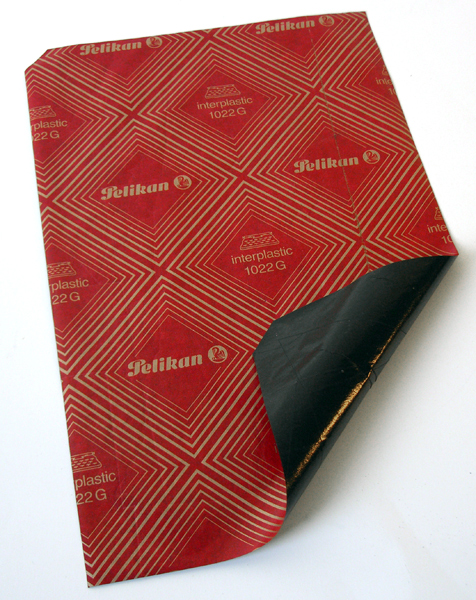
A sheet of carbon paper, with the coating side down

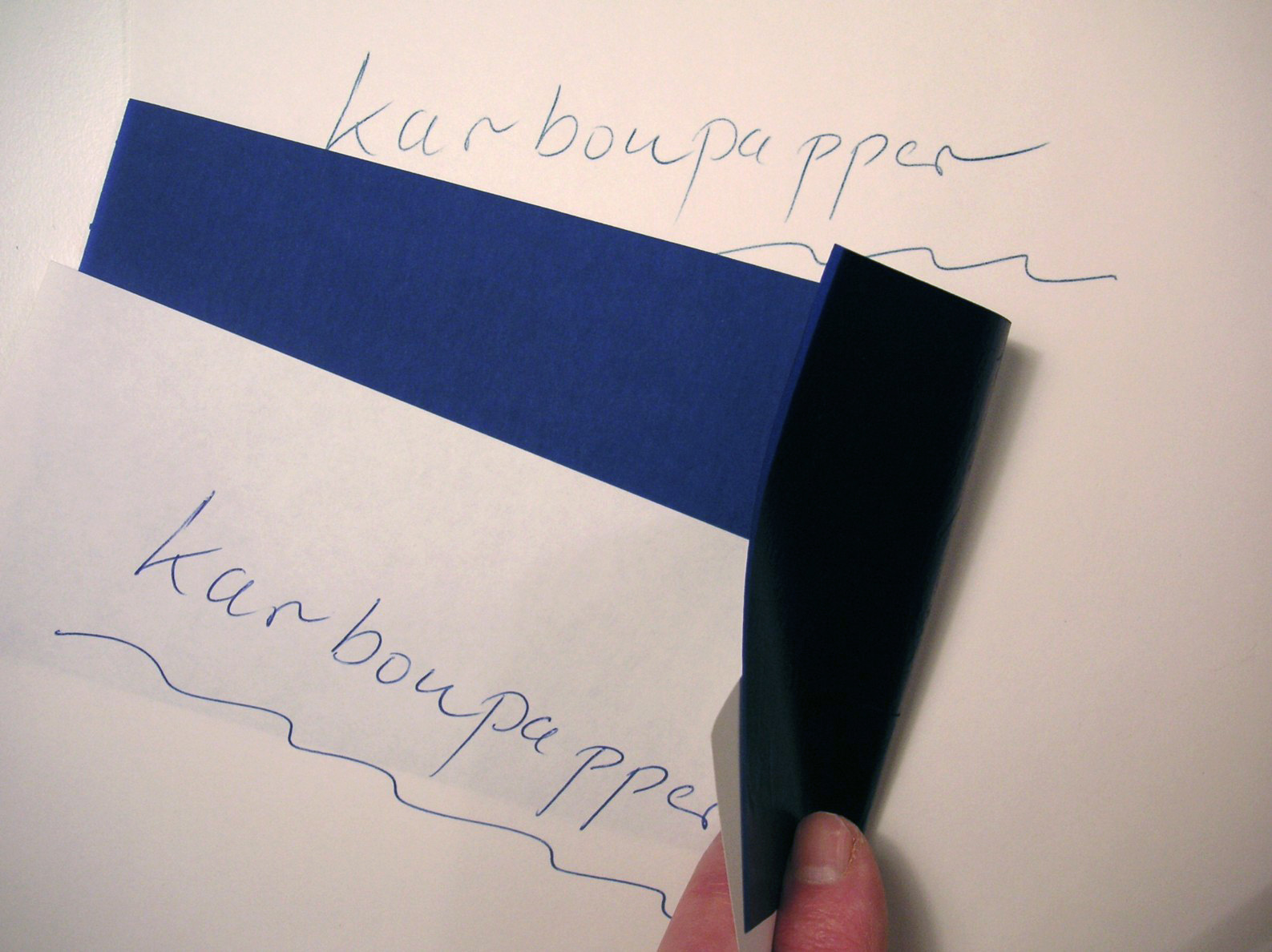
Handwriting duplicated through carbon paper

Carbon paper (originally carbonic paper) consists of sheets of paper that create one or more copies simultaneously with the creation of an original document when inscribed by a typewriter or ballpoint pen. The email term cc, which stands for "carbon copy", is derived from this use of carbon paper.

== History ==
In 1801, Pellegrino Turri, an Italian inventor, invented carbon paper to provide the ink for his mechanical typing machine, one of the first typewriters. Ralph Wedgwood obtained the first patent for carbon paper in 1806.

Carbon paper in its original form was paper coated on one side with a layer of a loosely bound dry ink or pigmented coating, bound with wax. The manufacture of carbon paper was formerly the largest consumer of montan wax. In 1954 the Columbia Ribbon & Carbon Manufacturing Company filed a patent for what became known in the trade as solvent carbon paper: the coating was changed from wax-based to polymer-based. The manufacturing process changed from a hot-melt method to a solvent-applied coating or set of coatings. It was then possible to use polyester or other plastic film as a substrate, instead of paper, although the name remained carbon paper. Copies created with solvent carbon paper were far less susceptible to smearing compared to ones made with wax-based carbon paper.

Carbon paper was the principal medium of reproduction for samizdat, a publication method used in the former Soviet Union in order to publish books without having to use state-controlled printing houses and risk the censorship or imprisonment.

== Modern uses ==
The advent of word processing and the decline of typewriting meant that any number of copies of a document could be printed on demand, and the decline of carbon paper, which had already been partially superseded by photocopying and carbonless copy paper, became irrevocable. A few specialist or remnant uses remain. Examples of these are receipts at point of sale (though they have mostly been relegated to being backups for when electronic POS devices fail) or for on-the-spot fine notices, duplicate checks, and some money orders (though the United States Postal Service has recently converted to an electronic format), and tracking slips for various expedited mail services requiring multiple copies. In India, form-filling is on a sufficient scale that carbon paper is still widely used. In 2013, in Canada, only one eight-person company still manufactured carbon paper; in the United Kingdom, one company; and in the United States, only two small companies.

There have been some experimental uses of carbon paper in art: as a surface for painting and mail art (to decorate envelopes). Carbon paper is commonly used to transfer patterns onto glass in the creation of stained glass.

Carbon paper disks are still used in school physics labs as part of experiments on projectile motion and position.

== See also ==
- Carbon copy
- Carbonless copy paper
- List of duplicating processes
