= Letter-quality printer =

Form of computer impact printer

A letter-quality printer was a form of computer impact printer that was able to print with the quality typically expected from a business typewriter such as an IBM Selectric.

A letter-quality printer operates in much the same fashion as a typewriter. A metal or plastic printwheel embossed with letters, numbers, or symbols strikes an inked ribbon, depositing the ink (or carbon, if an expensive single-strike ribbon was installed) on the page and thus printing a character.

Over time, several different technologies were developed including automating ordinary typebar typewriter mechanisms (such as the Friden Flexowriter), daisy wheel printers (dating from a 1939 patent, but brought to life in the 1970s by Diablo engineer David S. Lee) where the type is moulded around the edge of a wheel, and "golf ball" (the popular informal name for "typeball", as used in the IBM Selectric typewriter) printers where the type is distributed over the face of a globe-shaped printhead (including automating IBM Selectric mechanisms such as the IBM 2741 terminal). The daisy wheel and Selectric-based printers offered the advantage that the typeface was readily changeable by the user to accommodate varying needs.

These printers were referred to as "letter-quality printers" during their heyday, and could produce text which was as clear and crisp as a typewriter (though they were nowhere near the quality of printing presses). Most were available either as complete computer terminals with keyboards (or with a keyboard add-on option) that could double as a typewriter in stand-alone ("off-line") mode, or as print-only devices. Because of its low cost at the time, the daisy wheel printer became the most successful, the method used by Diablo, Qume, Brother and Apple.

Letter-quality impact printers, however, were slow, noisy, incapable of printing graphics or images (unless the programmable microspacing and over-use of the dot were employed), sometimes limited to monochrome, and limited to a fixed set (usually one) of typefaces without operator intervention, though certain font effects like underlining and boldface could be achieved by overstriking. Soon, dot-matrix printers (such as the Oki Microline 84) would offer "Near Letter Quality" (NLQ) modes which were much faster than daisy-wheel printers, could produce graphics well, but were still very noticeably lower than "letter quality". Nowadays, printers using non-impact printing (for example laser printers, inkjet printers, and other similar means) have replaced traditional letter-quality printers in most applications. The quality of inkjet printers can approach the old letter-quality impact printers (but can be limited by factors such as paper type).

== Use in word processing ==
Dedicated word processors and WP software for general-purpose computers that rose in popularity in the late 1970s and 1980s would use features such as microspacing (usually by 1/120 of an inch horizontally and, possibly, 1/48 of an inch vertically) to implement subscripts, proportional spacing, underlining, and so on. The more rudimentary software packages would implement bold text by overtyping the character in exactly the same spot (for example, using the backspace control code), but better software would print the letter in 3 slightly different positions. Software did exist to (slowly) produce pie charts on such printers (and on some daisywheels the dot was reinforced with metal to cope with extra wear).

== See also ==
- Apple Daisy Wheel Printer
- Diablo 630 — the archetypal daisy wheel printer
- Dot matrix printers
- Near-letter quality
- Teleprinter
