= Brother Twinriter =

Hybrid daisy wheel–dot matrix printer

Twinriter

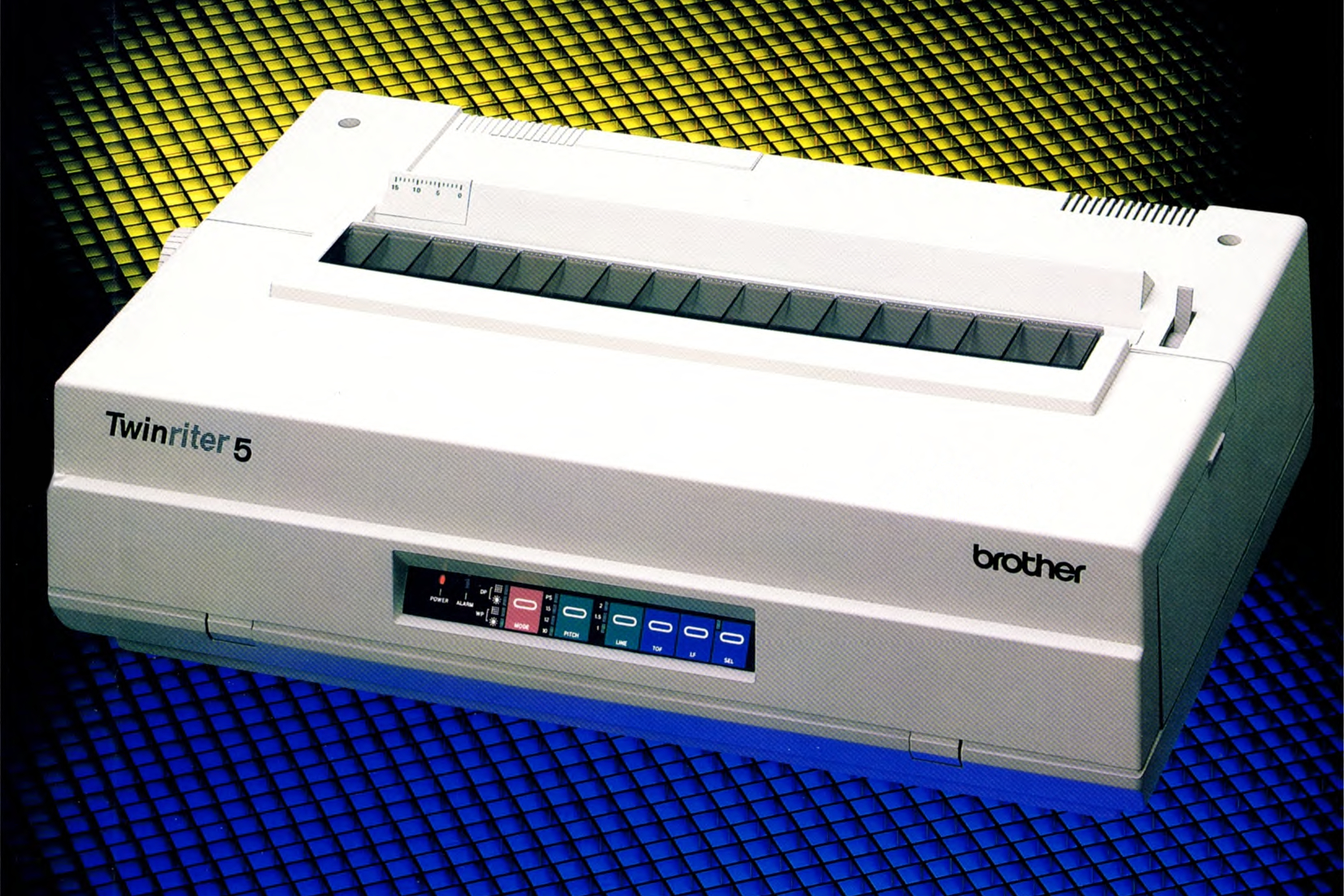
- Twinriter 5 (1985)
- Manufacturer: Brother Industries
- Introduced: June 1985; 41 years ago
- Type: Impact printer (hybrid daisy wheel and dot matrix)
- Connection: Parallel

The Twinriter is a series of impact computer printers released by Brother Industries starting in 1985. The Twinriter has a unique hybrid printing system, combining a daisy wheel, for producing letter-quality text, and a dot matrix printhead, for producing graphics and other symbols not present on the daisy wheel. Brother released only two printers in the Twinriter series: the Twinriter 5 in 1985 and the Twinriter 6 in 1987. Sales of the Twinriter did not meet Brother's projections, and by 1990 the family of printers was discontinued.

== Specifications ==
Brochure for the Twinriter 6 (1987), showing the optional sheet/envelope feeder

The original Twinriter 5 is a beige impact printer measuring 7.9 by 23.2 by 15.0 inches (20 by 59 by 38 cm) and weighing 35 pounds (16 kg). The printer features a unique dual hybrid printing system, combining a daisy wheel and a 9-pin dot matrix printhead—an industry first. The printer includes both types of printing systems to serve dual purposes: printing letter-quality text with the daisy wheel, and producing graphics and other specialized symbols not present on the daisy wheel with the dot matrix printhead. Other printers on the market featuring only one of the two printing technologies sacrificed one feature set for the other. While many dot matrix printers could produce both text and graphics, the quality of the letterforms produced by all but the most advanced near-letter-quality (NLQ) printers were poor; meanwhile, daisy wheel printers produced letterforms with a fidelity exceeding even the most expensive laser printers at the time, but could not produce arbitrary bitmap graphics and included only a handful of symbols. The Twinriter 5's dot matrix printhead can print up to 140 characters per second, while its daisy wheel printhead can print up to 36 characters per second. The Twinriter 5's stock amount of data buffer is 3 KB, expandable to 11 KB or 19 KB as part of an aftermarket upgrade.

Users can set the Twinriter to operate in one of two modes: DP (data processing) mode and WP (word processing) mode. In DP mode, the printer eschews the daisy wheel completely to print both text and graphics through the dot matrix printhead, operating exactly like any other serial dot matrix printer. In WP mode, the Twinriter switches between daisy wheel and dot matrix on the fly, printing the 95 printable ASCII characters on the daisy wheel and graphics and special symbols on the dot matrix printhead. The printer's dot matrix controller supports ESC/P escape codes to control the dot matrix printhead and Diablo 630 escape codes to control the daisy wheel. Office suites for MS-DOS allowing users to compose documents with graphics and text using the Twinriter in WP mode in 1986 included Lotus 1-2-3, Enable, and Framework; by late 1987, support for the Twinriter was added to several popular word processors including Microsoft Word, PC-Write, and Words & Figures—with preliminary support under the most popular word processor of the day, WordPerfect, in development that year.

As stock, the Twinriters are designed with a friction-feed platen accepting plain loose-leaf paper up to 16.5 inches in width, one at a time. Brother additionally sold an optional single-bin sheet feeder, allowing the printer to automatically pull in new sheets of paper as needed for multi-page documents, as well as bidirectional (reversible) pin-feed platen accepting continuous tractor-feed paper. In fall 1985, the company introduced a three-bin sheet feeder, with the smallest of the three bins specifically for envelopes.

As with all daisy wheel printers, the included daisy wheel of the Twinriter can be swapped out for another daisy wheel featuring a different font, although this interchange had to be done manually by the end user, necessitating pausing the print during swaps. The Twinriter accepts daisy wheel cartridges from Brother's family of standalone daisy wheel word processors and printers; by 1986, the company had 180 different daisy wheels. Most dot matrix printers at the time were capable of printing text in only one typeface of a fixed size, although the Twinriter's dot matrix printhead can print in five different font sizes, including a 24-by-24 character mode, which approaches NLQ printing (from a distance).

The Twinriter 6 was virtually identical to its predecessor except for a faster dot matrix printhead, added support for IBM 5152 escape codes in DP mode and Diablo 630/ECS daisy wheels in WP mode, and a slightly heavier weight to the chassis.

== Development and release ==
Brother Industries unveiled the original Twinriter 5 in April 1985. In the decade prior, Brother had established themselves as a major manufacturer of dot matrix printers and daisy wheel printers and typewriters, before developing the Twinriter series as a marriage of those two technologies. The Twinriter 5 was released to market in June 1985, at a street price of US$1,295. The company supported the rollout of the Twinriter with an extensive corporate sales program, targeting Fortune 500 companies and leveraging their network of 1,000 dealers to try to win accounts for the Twinriter 5.

== Sales and reception ==
Despite Brother's large marketing push, the Twinriter sold slower than Brother had anticipated. By October 1986, over a year after its introduction, the Twinriter 5 had only sold roughly 1,500 units. Alex Schibanoff, an executive of Brother's Information Systems division, explained in 1986 that a combination of high costs and "the misperception of Twinriter as a sort of strange animal" conspired to keep sales of the printer sluggish. In 1987, Brother discontinued the Twinriter 5 and introduced the Twinriter 6. The latter was discontinued by 1990, having failed to accrue a large pool of supported software.

Despite the disappointing sales, the Twinriter line was broadly praised by technology journalists of the time. PC Magazine's Richard Ridington, in a review of the Twinriter 5, concluded that the printer offered "excellent versatility and good speed at a reasonable price". Creative Computing's Owen Linzmayer wrote that the Twinriter 5's "versatility suits it ideally to office automation, yet its modest price makes it attractive for home businesses as well". Hillel Segal in the Pittsburgh Post-Gazette wrote that the quality of the Twinriter 5's printouts were better than that of his HP LaserJet in certain respects, while Rick Doherty in Electronic Engineering Times called the Twinriter 5 superior to Apple's LaserWriter. Segal deemed the Twinriter 5 preferable to laser printers for low-volume applications, despite some downsides, on account of its ease of use and versatility. Richard Sherwin of the New York Daily News wrote that, "for consumers who require both true letterquality printing and highspeed graphics abilities—but who may be short on home or office space—this machine does everything it advertises". PC World's Jon Stewart was more tempered in his praise, writing: "Were you to split it in half, the [T]winriter 5 would be either an expensive dot matrix printer—given its low speed and print quality—or an expensive and slow daisy wheel. But compared to the laser option, it has to be considered a cheap way out of at least one of life's nagging choices".

PC Magazine's Vincent Pugila called the output of the Twinriter 6's daisy wheel as superior to any laser printer he had used and appreciated the fact that it could print high-quality letterforms over multipart forms, which laser printers could not do. InfoWorld's Steve King rated the Twinriter 6 a satisfactory value with "somewhat limited appeal", assessing the output of the daisy wheel as excellent but the output of the dot matrix printhead as mediocre and its speed the lowest of any dot matrix printer the magazine had reviewed up to that point.
