= Apple Daisy Wheel Printer =

Type of printer

- Type: Daisy wheel
- Ports: RS-232C
- Speed: 40 characters per second (average)
- Weight: 37.0 pounds (16.8 kg)
- Dimensions: (H × W × D) 6.87 × 23.22 × 14.84 in

The Apple Daisy Wheel Printer is a daisy wheel printer manufactured by Qume and sold by Apple Computer, Inc. in the 1980s. It utilized the ASCII character set and used continuous form paper, or with an optional feeder, cut sheet paper. The printer included several different 130-character "daisy" print wheels (e.g., Courier, Prestige Elite, Gothic, Executive) in English, French, German, and other languages. These 130-character print wheels are unique to the Apple DWP; the standard Qume printwheel has 96 characters.

It could be used with the Lisa system, Apple III system, and Apple IIe or Apple II Plus system if the Super Serial Interface Card was installed.

When used with the Lisa, the printer could produce simple graphics by microstepping the print head and using the period, pipe ( | ), and slash characters. The period is reinforced with brass to prevent it wearing out.

This printer is also referred to as the Apple Letter Quality printer.

While Apple themselves never developed an official method for allowing users of the then-nascent Macintosh computer to make use of the Apple Daisy Wheel Printer, 3rd-party drivers were developed by the software company Assimilation Process that permitted a user to connect it and other daisy wheel printers to a Macintosh.
