= Page orientation =

Orientation of a page designed for viewing

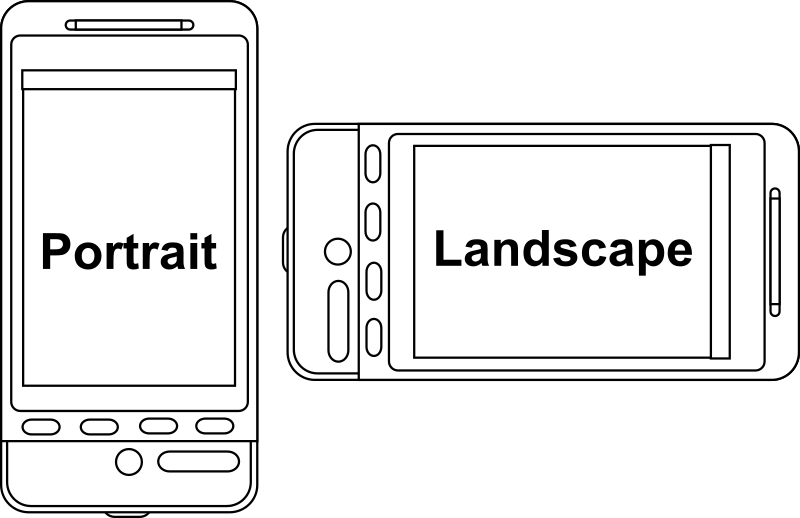
A smartphone positioned upright (portrait orientation) and horizontally (landscape orientation)

Page orientation is the way in which a rectangular page is oriented for normal viewing. The two most common types of orientation are portrait and landscape. The term "portrait orientation" comes from visual art terminology and describes the dimensions used to capture a person's face and upper body in a picture; in such images, the height of the display area is greater than the width. The term "landscape orientation" also reflects visual art terminology, where pictures with more width than height are needed to fully capture the horizon within an artist's view.

Besides describing the way documents can be viewed and edited, the concepts of "portrait" and "landscape" orientation can also be used to describe video and photography display options (where the concept of "aspect ratio" replaces that of "page orientation"). Many types of visual media use landscape mode, especially the 4:3 aspect ratio used for classic TV formatting, which is 4 units or pixels wide and 3 units tall, and the 16:9 aspect ratio for newer, widescreen media viewing.

Most paper documents use portrait orientation. By default, most computer and television displays use landscape orientation, while most mobile phones use portrait orientation (with some flexibility on modern smartphones to switch screen orientations according to user preference). Portrait mode is preferred for editing page layout work, in order to view the entire page of a screen at once without showing wasted space outside the borders of a page, and for script-writing, legal work (in drafting contracts etc.), and other applications where it is useful to see a maximum number of lines of text. It is also preferred for smartphone use, as a phone in portrait orientation can be operated easily with one hand. Landscape viewing, on the other hand, visually caters to the natural horizontal alignment of human eyes at the same time landscape details are much wider than they are tall, and is therefore useful for portraying wider visuals with multiple elements that need to be observed simultaneously.

== History ==
=== Prior to computers ===
In the 1932 edition of the Oxford English Dictionary, the entry for "frontispiece" gave: "The frontispiece … may be printed either upright (termed portrait) or broad way (termed landscape). If a full-page illustration be printed landscape, the inscription or caption beneath must read from foot to head."

=== Computer displays ===
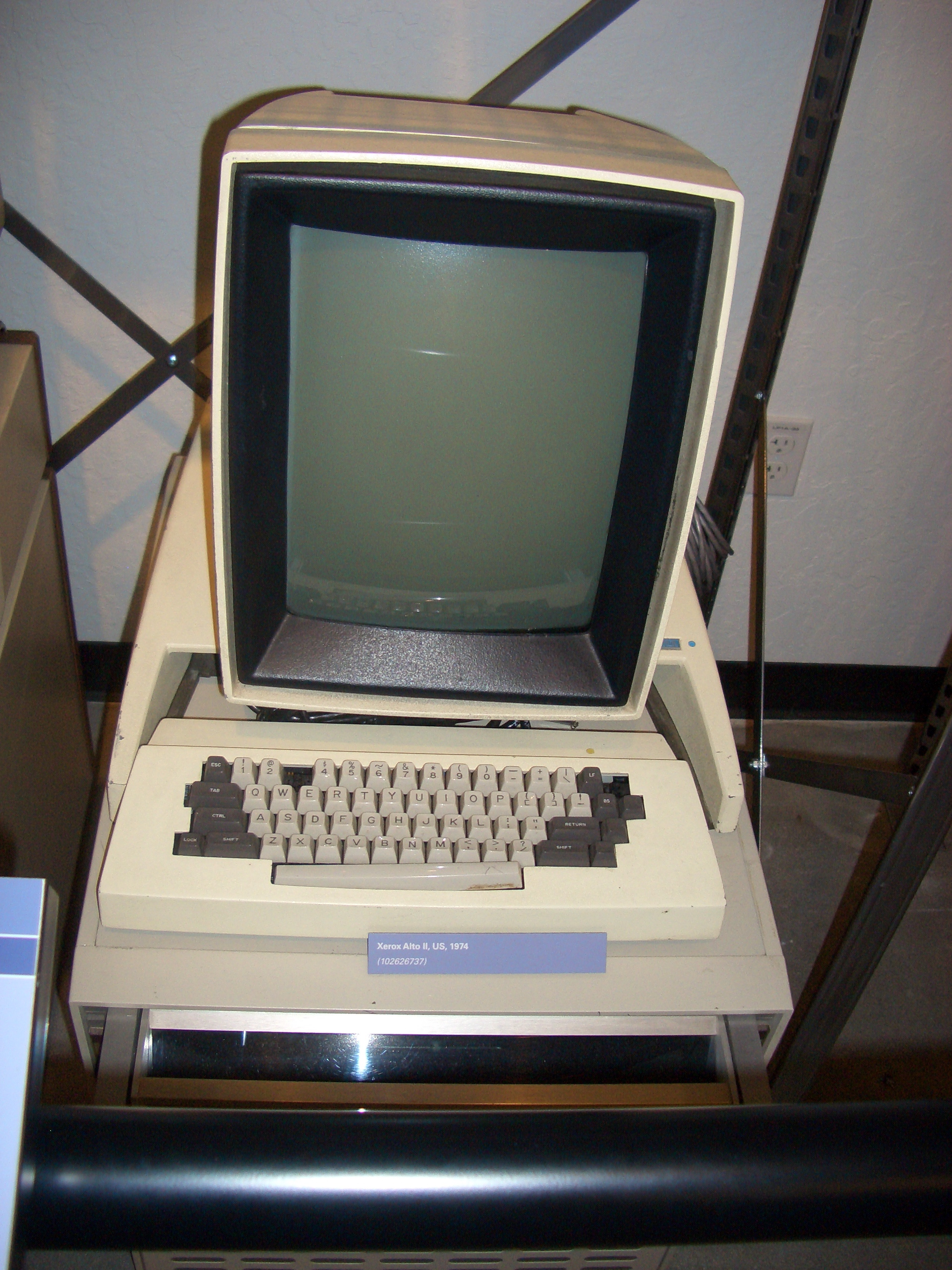
The Xerox Alto portrait display

Portrait mode was first used on the Xerox Alto computer, which was considered technologically well ahead of its time when the system was first developed. Xerox product marketers did not understand how revolutionary the system was, and the portrait display faded away while common landscape-display televisions were appropriated for use as an inexpensive early microcomputer display.

The IBM DisplayWriter had a portrait monitor and keyboard with large backspace key, as it was designed for use in word processing instead of spreadsheets. Lanier, Wang, and CPT also made competing dedicated word processing computers with portrait modes. The height of the market for these computers was the late 1970s and early 1980s, prior to the introduction of the IBM PC. However, according to a long-time regional manager of the IBM personal computer division, speaking in confidence to the author of this entry in the mid-1980s, when the IBM PC was introduced, no portrait mode was made available for two reasons: (1) Top management did not want the PC division to undermine the DisplayWriter product, (2) The computer was designed with spreadsheets and software development in mind, not word processing. Thus, it had a keyboard without a large backspace key at first, substituting a key widely used in computer software writing. Within a short period of time, the DisplayWriter and other dedicated word processors were no longer available.

For the first computing devices a screen was built to operate in only portrait or landscape mode, and changing between orientations was not possible. Typically a custom video controller board was needed to support the unusual screen orientation, and software often needed to be custom-written in order to support the tall, narrow screen layout. However, rotating displays were attempted in early computer-aided typesetting products, such as the Xenotron XVC-2 which permitted the rotation of the screen and fascia between landscape and portrait orientations, with the disk drives occupying a position below or to the right of the screen respectively. The Facit Twist was a video terminal whose A4-sized monitor could be oriented in portrait mode, showing an 80-column, 72-line character display (employing a 7 x 16 pixel font), or in landscape mode, showing an 80-column, 24-line character display (employing a 16 x 20 pixel font). The monitor could be "twisted" or pivoted by ninety degrees to select the appropriate viewing mode. The Corvus Concept also offered a display that could be used in either portrait or landscape mode.

As video display technology advanced, eventually, the video display board was able to accommodate rotation of the display and a variety of different resolutions and scan rates. When the Macintosh computer was introduced, WYSIWYG page layout using Aldus PageMaker became popular. The Macintosh rekindled interest in portrait displays, and the first portrait displays for it were developed by Radius Inc. After several years of producing the first Macintosh portrait display, Radius introduced the Radius Pivot Display that could be freely rotated between landscape and portrait with automatic orientation changes done by the video controller. Building on this technology, Portrait Display Labs leapt into this market niche, producing a number of rotating CRT monitors as well as software which could be used as a driver for many video cards.

The later advent of the World Wide Web, whose pages are largely in portrait mode, failed to result in a widespread return to portrait displays. As of November 2011, for instance, HP no longer sold monitors in portrait mode, although they have a display stand which permits the user to attach two monitors and rotate either from landscape to display.

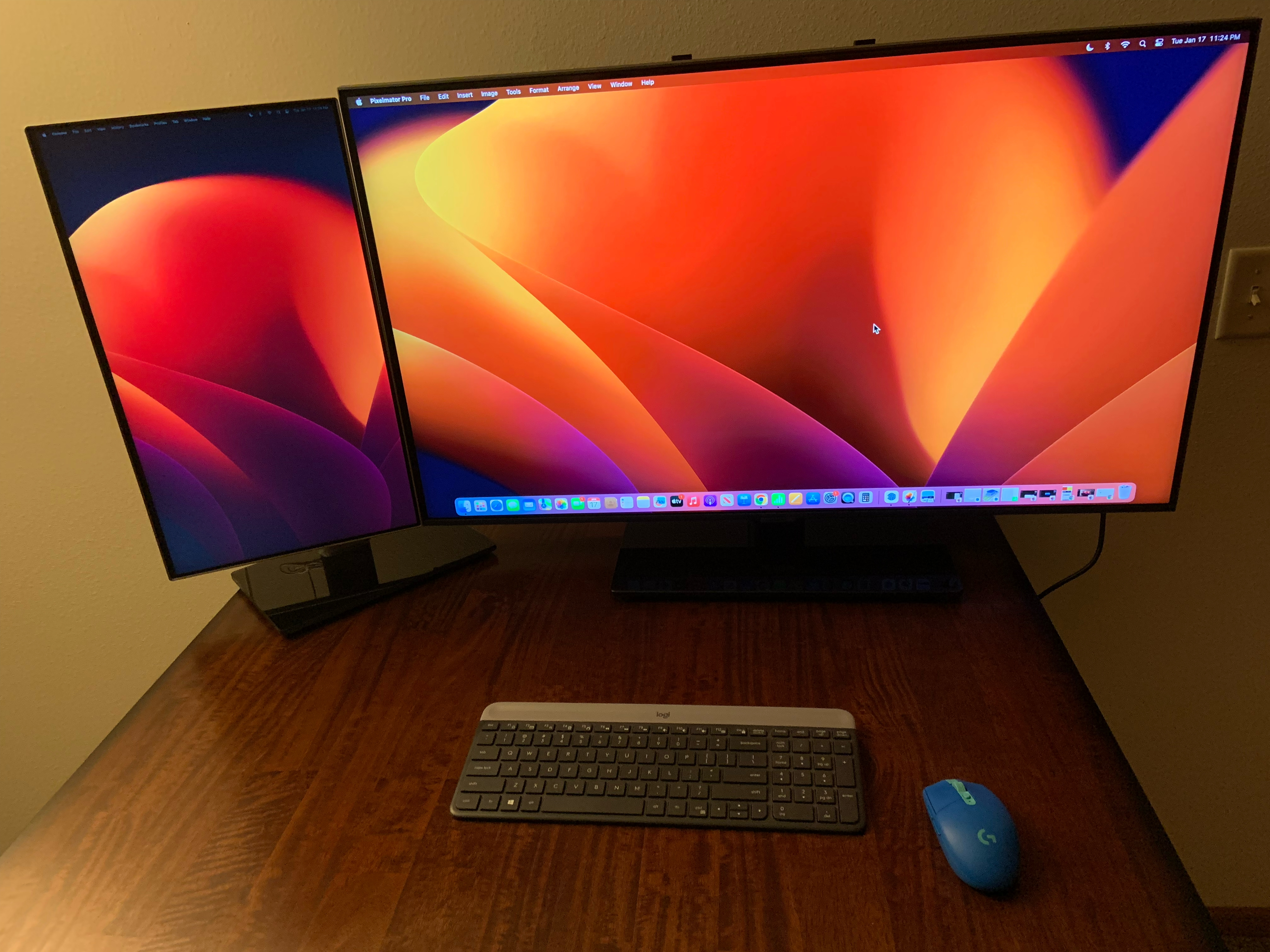
Vertical monitor in portrait orientation to the left and a landscape main display in the center

Rotation is now a common feature of modern video cards, and is widely used in tablet PCs (many tablet devices can sense the direction of gravity and automatically rotate the image), and by writers, layout artists, etc. Operating systems and drivers do not always support it; for example, Windows XP Service Pack 3 conflicts with monitor rotation on many graphics cards using ATI's Catalyst control software, Nvidia's proprietary drivers for Linux do not support screen rotation unless manual changes are made to its configuration.

=== Video game displays ===
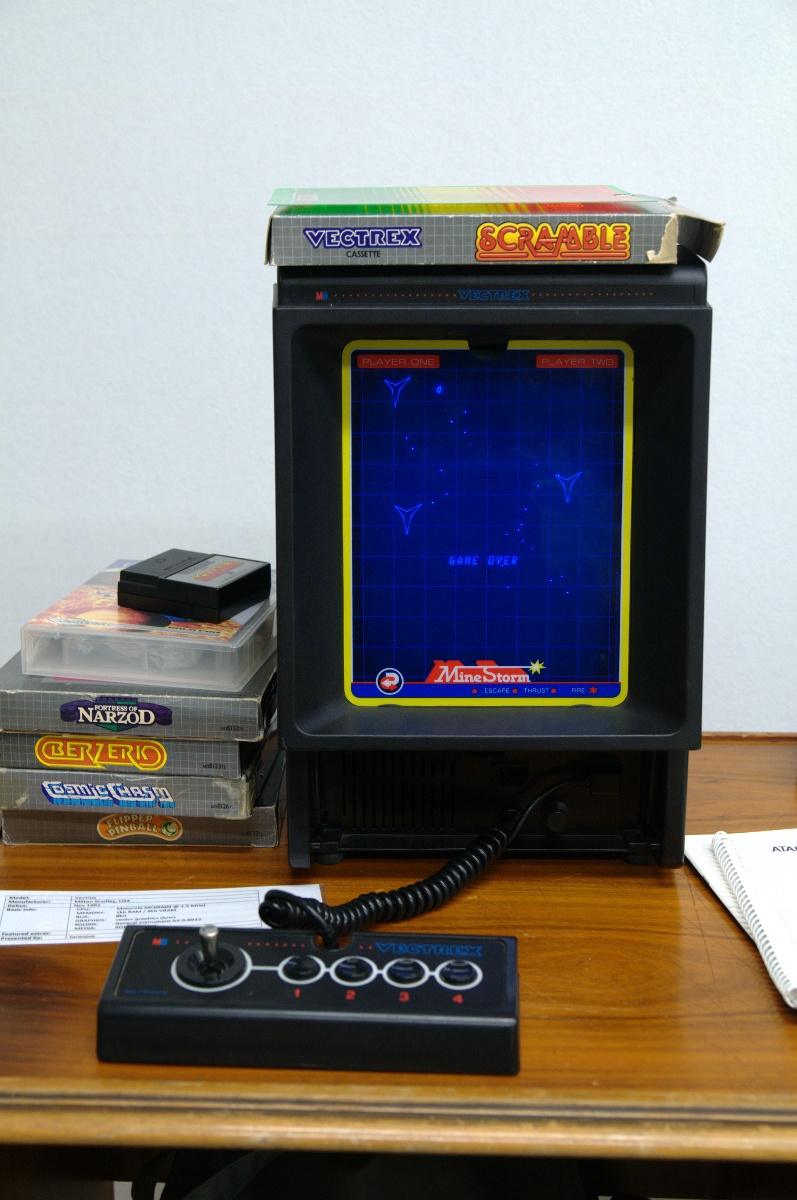
A Vectrex games console, with its portrait screen

Portrait mode is popular with arcade games that involve a vertically oriented playing area, such as Pac-Man and Donkey Kong. The vertical orientation allows greater detail along the vertical axis while conserving detail on the sides.

Although the early Vectrex home console had a built-in, vertically-oriented screen, the majority of home games consoles were designed to interface with standard television sets, which use landscape orientation. As a consequence, the conversion of early popular arcade games to home consoles was difficult, not only because the home computing capability was lower, but also the screen orientation was mismatched and the home user could not be expected to set their television on its side to show the game correctly. This is why most early home versions of arcade games have a wide, squashed appearance compared to the full-quality arcade versions.

Modern arcade emulators are able to handle this difference in screen orientation by dynamically changing the screen resolution to allow the portrait oriented game to resize and fit a landscape display, showing wide empty black bars on the sides of the portrait-on-landscape screen.

Bandai's handheld WonderSwan console was designed to be used both vertically and horizontally, and certain Nintendo DS games, such as Sonic Rush and Mr. Driller Drill Spirits would use its two landscape screens together to make one portrait-orientated play field.

Portrait orientation is still used occasionally within some arcade and home titles (either giving the option of using black bars or rotating the display), primarily in the vertical shoot 'em up genre due to considerations of aesthetics, tradition and gameplay. Games made primarily for mobile devices are often designed around portrait mode play.

== Modern display rotation methods ==
Modern video cards can offer digital screen rotation capabilities. However, for it to be used correctly, a special display is required that is designed to be pivoted.

=== Rotation of CRT monitors ===
Some CRT monitors are designed to permit rotation into portrait mode. For the remainder, technical issues can occur when turning a standard CRT monitor or television on its side:

- The cooling vents are normally designed for natural air convection flow from bottom to top; turning the case sideways can lead to unintended heat buildup and component failure.
- The typical CRT monitor plastic case is not designed to sit stably when turned sideways without a custom-made supporting stand.
- The weight of a large CRT is typically meant to bear on the base frame. A plastic case may flex or crack if the CRT weight is supported only by the thin plastic surround.

=== Rotation of LCD monitors ===
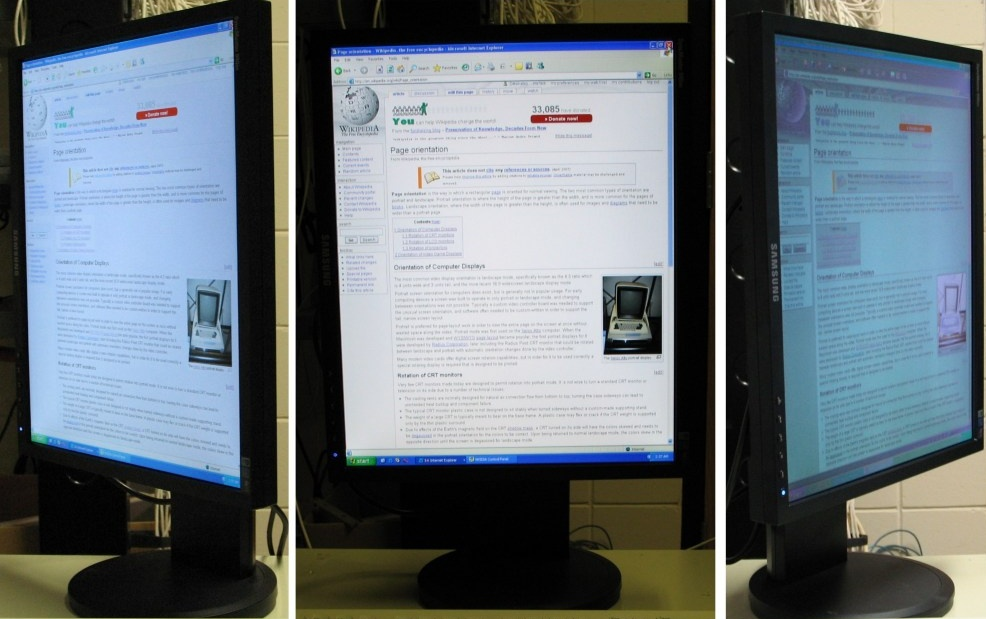
Poor side-viewing image quality of an LCD monitor rotated into portrait orientation

Good side-viewing image quality of a typical landscape LCD

Rotation of LCD monitors is simpler than for bulkier displays since the mass of the panel is low, the heat generated is low, and there are no magnetic effects to be concerned about. Higher quality panels can feature built-in pivot points to allow the user to rotate the screen into portrait mode. However, as a result of the light polarization technology, an LCD monitor, particularly TN panels, the angle of image viewability will degrade when rotated. Liquid crystal displays vary in contrast when viewed from different angles along one axis. This axis is normally oriented to be vertical so that the image quality appears unchanged when the screen is viewed from the side, and image contrast is adjusted by tilting the panel up or down. By rotating the screen 90 degrees, the varying contrast axis is now horizontal and a viewer to one side will see a washed out light contrast image, while a viewer on the other side sees a very dark contrast image.

=== Rotation of projectors ===
Projectors can generally operate from any angle due to the compact, rigid design and a cooling system utilizing a forced-air fan. However, for larger, heavier projectors, there is a problem mounting the projector sideways since nearly all ceiling mounts assume the projector hangs down from the mount in an upside-down landscape position. Extra-heavy bracing or weighted counterbalancing may be required to support a projector in a sideways portrait orientation.

For modern projectors using an Hg-lamp (mercury-vapor lamp), turning them sideways will shorten the lifespan of the bulb.

== See also ==
- Flat panel display
- History of display technology
- Multi-monitor
- Page printer
- Vector monitor
- Virtual desktop
