= RK05 =

Disk drive for Digital Equipment Corporation minicomputers

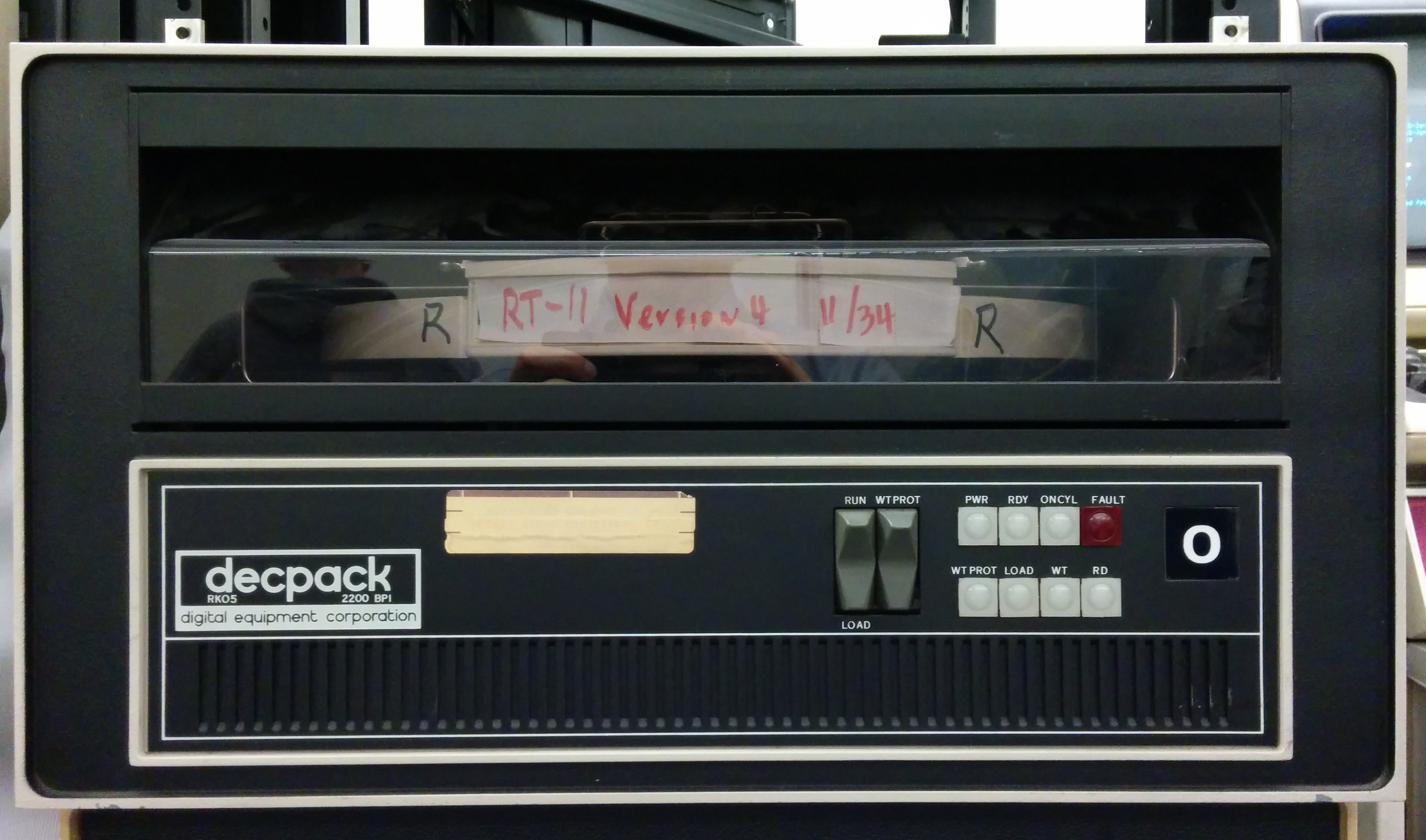
An RK05 drive with a mounted disk pack containing RT-11.

The RK05 is a disk drive manufactured by Digital Equipment Corporation whose removable disk pack can hold about 2.5 megabytes of data. Introduced 1972, it is similar to IBM's 1964-introduced 2310, and uses a disk pack similar to IBM's 2315 disk pack, although the latter only held 1 megabyte. An RK04 drive, which has half the capacity of an RK05, was also offered.

Systems on which it can be used include DEC's PDP-8, PDP-11, and PDP-15.

== Overview ==
The RK05 was a moving head magnetic disk drive manufactured by DEC. (Note: The RK05 was not a "rebadged" product, i.e. another manufacturer's product with a DEC label.) It stored approximately 2.5 MB on a 14", single-platter IBM-2315-style front-loading removable disk cartridge. The cartridge permitted users to have relatively unlimited off-line storage and to have very fast access to such data.

The PDP systems to which it could be attached had numerous operating systems for each computer architecture, so by changing disk pack another operating system could also be booted. Although the 14-inch cartridge could not fit in a shirt pocket, unlike DECtape, the RK05 provided personal, portable, and expandable storage.

Although a minimal PDP-8/A came with only one drive, most computers were configured with at least one additional storage device; some systems had four (Note: or even eight: DEC DATAsystem-535) drives.

== Technical details ==
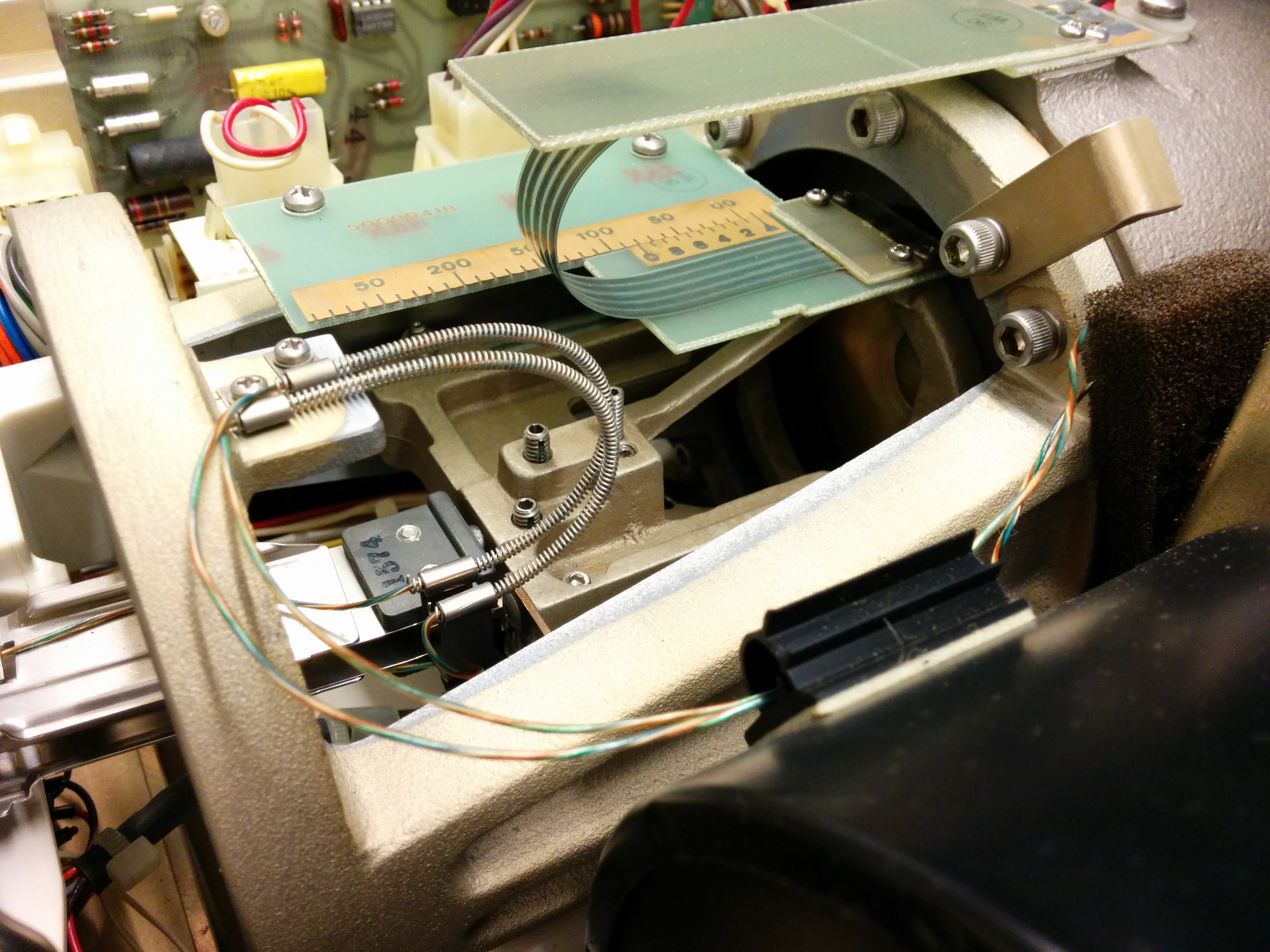
Drive head mechanism on an RK05 disk drive from Digital Equipment Corporation.

Occupying 10.5 inches (6U) of space in a standard 19-inch rack, the drive was competitive at the time. The cartridge contained a single, 14" aluminum platter coated with iron oxide in an epoxy binder. The two ferrite and ceramic read/write heads were pressed towards the disk by spring arms, floating on an air bearing maintained by the rotation of the disk. They were positioned by a voice coil actuator using a linear optical encoder for feedback. The track density was 100 tracks-per-inch. The bit density along the track was about 2200 bits-per-inch. Discrete electronics computed the velocity profile for seeks commanded by the controller. An absolute filter (HEPA filter) provided pressurized air to the cartridge, excluding most contaminants that would otherwise cause head crashes.

When used on 16-bit systems such as the PDP-11, the drive stored roughly 1.2 megawords. When used on 12-bit systems such as the PDP-8, the drive stored 1.6 megawords (so roughly the same bit capacity, albeit formatted differently). Multiple drives were daisy chained from their controller using Unibus cabling; a terminator was installed in the farthest drive.

The 16-bit (Unibus) controller was known as the RK11; it allowed the connection of up to eight RK05 drives. Seeks could be overlapped among the drives but only one drive at a time could transfer data.

The most-common 12-bit (Omnibus) controller was known as the RK8E; it supported up to four RK05 drives. The RK05 disk had more than 4096 sectors and so could not be addressed completely by a single PDP-8 12-bit word. To accommodate this, the OS/8 operating system split each drive into two logical volumes, for example, RKA0 and RKB0, representing the outermost and innermost cylinders of the drive.

== Predecessors ==
Prior to the introduction of DEC's own drives, DEC resold two drives from Diablo Data Systems (later acquired by Xerox), the 1.22 megabyte RK02, of which very few were shipped, and the 2.45 megabyte RK03 (Diablo Model 31). These were interface compatible with the RK05; RK03 and RK05 disks could be interchanged as well. The RK04 was DEC's counterpart to the RK02, for low-density storage of 600 Kwords, and the RK05 was DEC's counterpart of the high-density RK03, storing 1.2 Mwords.

== Variants ==
- The RK05E was a late version of the standard-density RK05 drive. It contained many reliability enhancements compared to the earlier versions.
- The RK05J was the final version of the standard-density RK05 removable pack drive.
- A non-removable RK05F was also produced. By "fixing" the otherwise removable cartridge in place, it was able to avoid the cartridge-to-cartridge compatibility problems that limited the capacity of the ordinary RK05. As a result, it could operate at twice the normal track density, doubling the capacity of the drive to about 5MB.

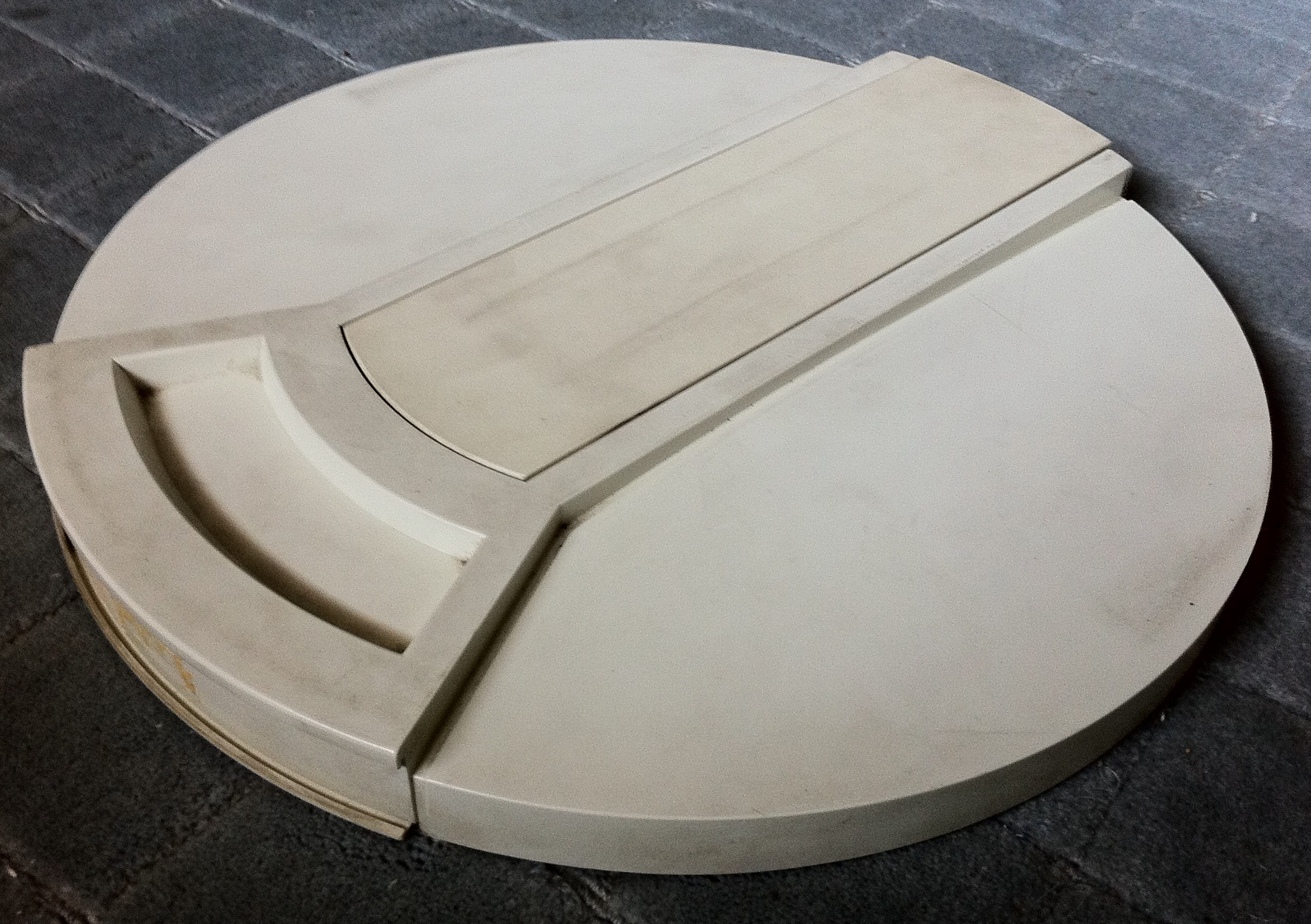
(removable) disk cartridge

== Compatibles ==
RK05-compatible non-DEC RK05s were produced and marketed.
