= Near letter-quality printing =

Dot-matrix printing process

Near letter-quality (NLQ) printing is a process where dot matrix printers produce high-quality text by using multiple passes to produce higher dot density. The tradeoff for the improved print quality is reduced printing speed. Software can also be used to produce this effect. The term was coined in the 1980s to distinguish NLQ printing from true letter-quality printing, as produced by a printer based on traditional typewriter technology such as a daisy wheel, or by a laser printer.

In 1985, The New York Times described the marketing of printers with the terms "near letter-quality, or N.L.Q." as "just a neat little bit of hype", but acknowledged that they "really show their stuff in the area of fonts, print enhancements and graphics".

== Technology overview ==
Near letter-quality is a form of impact dot matrix printing. What The New York Times called "dot-matrix impact printing", was deemed almost good enough to be used in a business letter

Reviews in the later 1980s ranged from "good but not great" to "endowed with a simulated typewriter-like quality".

By using multiple passes of the carriage, and higher dot density, the printer could increase the effective resolution. For example, the Epson FX-86 could achieve a theoretical addressable dot-grid of 240 by 216 dots/inch using a print head with a vertical dot density of only 72 dots/inch, by making multiple passes of the print head for each line. For 240 by 144 dots/inch, the print head would make one pass, printing 240 by 72 dots/inch, then the printer would advance the paper by half of the vertical dot pitch (1/144 inch), then the print head would make a second pass. For 240 by 216 dots/inch, the print head would make three passes with smaller paper movement (1/3 vertical dot pitch, or 1/216 inch) between the passes. To cut hardware costs, some manufacturers merely used a double strike (doubly printing each line) to increase the printed text's boldness, resulting in bolder but still jagged text. In all cases, NLQ mode incurred a severe speed penalty.

Because of the slow speed of NLQ printing, all NLQ printers have at least one "draft mode", in which the same fonts are used, but with only one pass of the print head per line. This produces lower-resolution printing, but at higher speed.

Expensive NLQ printers had multiple fonts built-in, and some had a slot where a font cartridge could be inserted to add more fonts. Printer utility software could be used to print with multiple fonts on less-expensive printers. Not all of these utilities worked with all printers and applications, however.
