= Daisy Systems Holland =

Dutch printer manufacturer

Daisy Systems Holland BV was a Dutch manufacturer of daisy-wheel printers (hence the name), later expanded into other printer technologies: inkjet, dot matrix, and laser. Headquartered in Wijchen, it was acquired in 1987 from its Canadian parent AES Data, by Jan Cornelisse, the then managing director of Daisy Systems, who became its majority shareholder. In 1980s, it claimed to be the largest specialist printer company in Europe. The company was formed in 1977 after its predecessor company went bankrupt.

It was also planning to expand into manufacturing of Braille printers for the visually handicapped.

== Printer models ==
- AES 7300 (note this is a WP system, not a model of daisywheel printer)
- Daisy Systems M20, M45, M50
