= Comparison of early word processors =

This article compares early word processing software.

== Operating system compatibility ==
This table gives a comparison of what operating systems are compatible with each word processor in 1985.

Word processor	Apple	Atari	CP/M	CPT	C64	HP	IBM PC	Kaypro	Mac	Morrow	IBM PCjr	Rainbow 100	TIPC	Tandy	ZX Spectrum
Tasword	No	No	No	No	Yes	No	No	No	No	No	No	No	No	No	Yes
Homeword	II, IIc,IIe	800	No	No	Yes	No	Yes	No	No	No	Yes	No	No	No	No
MacWrite	No	No	No	No	No	No	No	No	Yes	No	No	No	No	No	No
Pfs:Write	II, IIc,IIe	No	No	No	No	No	Yes	No	No	No	Yes	No	No	No	No
AtariWriter	No	800XL, 1200	No	No	No	No	No	No	No	No	No	No	No	No	No
OMNIWRITER	No	No	No	No	Yes	No	No	No	No	No	No	No	No	No	No
Word Juggler	II,IIe,III	No	No	No	No	No	No	No	No	No	No	No	No	No	No
PC-Write	No	No	No	No	No	No	Yes	No	No	No	Yes	No	No	No	No
Wordvision	No	No	No	No	No	No	Yes	No	No	No	No	No	No	No	No
Volkswriter deluxe	No	No	No	No	No	No	Yes	No	No	No	Yes	No	Yes	No	No
Perfect Writer	No	No	Yes	No	No	No	Yes	Yes	No	No	No	No	No	No	No
Plu Perfect	No	No	No	No	No	No	No	2,4,10	No	Yes	No	No	No	No	No
WordStar	II,IIe	No	Yes	No	No	110,150	Yes	Yes	No	Yes	Yes	Yes	Yes	TRS-80	No
NewWord	IIe	No	Yes	No	No	No	Yes	Yes	No	Yes	No	No	No	No	No
Appleworks	II, IIe	No	No	No	No	No	No	No	No	No	No	No	No	No	No
AppleWriter	II, IIe, III	No	No	No	No	No	No	No	No	No	No	No	No	No	No
III E-Z Pieces	III	No	No	No	No	No	No	No	No	No	No	No	No	No	No
Symphony	No	No	No	No	No	No	Yes	No	No	No	No	No	No	No	No
Framework	No	No	No	No	No	No	Yes	No	No	No	No	No	No	No	No
XY Write II+	No	No	No	No	No	No	Yes	No	No	No	No	No	No	No	No
WordPerfect	No	No	No	No	No	No	Yes	No	No	No	No	Yes	Yes	Tandy 2000	No
Microsoft Word	No	No	No	No	No	No	Yes	No	Yes	No	No	Yes	Yes	Tandy 2000	No
CPT Word Processors	No	No	Yes	Yes	No	No	Yes	No	No	No	Yes	No	No	No	No
