= David S. Lee =

David S. Lee (李信麟; pinyin: Lǐ Xìnlín) is a Chinese-American business executive and entrepreneur. He was CEO, president and chairman of eOn Communications Corporation, a telecom company, from 1991 to 2014.

== Early life ==
Lee was born in China around 1938. He received a B.S. in mechanical engineering from Montana State University in 1960. He obtained an M.S. in the same field from North Dakota State University. He has received an honorary doctorate from Montana State University in 1993.

== Career ==
Lee was the CEO of eOn Communications Corporation from 2003 and was the chairman from 1991. In 2008, eOn bought Cortelco, a maker of customer-premises equipment based at Corinth, Mississippi. Lee had bought Cortelco from ITT Industries, Inc. in 1990, and was the chairman and controlling shareholder of Cortelco. In 2014, eOn was merged into Inventergy, Inc., an intellectual property acquisition and licensing company.

From 1985 to 1988, Lee was president and chairman of Data Technology Corporation, a computer peripheral company. Prior to 1985, he was group executive and chairman of the Business Information Systems Group of ITT. He was also president of ITT subsidiary ITT Qume, formerly Qume Corporation, a computer systems peripherals company which Lee co-founded in 1973 prior to its acquisition by ITT Corporation in 1978.

Lee has also been on the boards of ESS Technology, Inc., Linear Technology, iBASIS and Daily Wellness Company.

== Public service ==
Lee was appointed to the board of the Regents of the University of California in 1994 and his term ended in 2006. He has also been a member of the board of governors for California Community Colleges.

He was an advisor to Presidents Bush and Clinton on the Advisory Committee on Trade Policy and Negotiation (Office of the U.S. Trade Representative/Executive Office of the President) and to Governor Wilson through the California Economic Development Corporation and the council on California Competitiveness. From around 2002, Lee was a member of the President's Council on the 21st Century Workforce, appointed by President George W. Bush.
