= Diablo Data Systems =

Computer hardware company, printers, disk drives

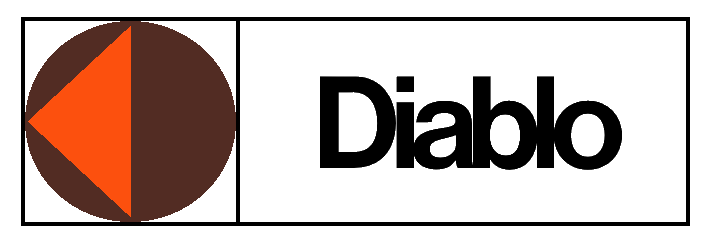
- Company type: Division
- Industry: Computer
- Predecessor: Diablo Systems Inc.
- Founded: 1969; 56 years ago in Cupertino, California
- Defunct: 1972; 53 years ago
- Fate: Acquired by Xerox
- Parent: Xerox

Diablo Data Systems was a division of Xerox created by the acquisition of Diablo Systems Inc. for US$29 million in 1972, a company that had been founded in 1969 by George E. Comstock, Charles L. Waggoner and others. The company was the first to release a daisy wheel printer, in 1970.

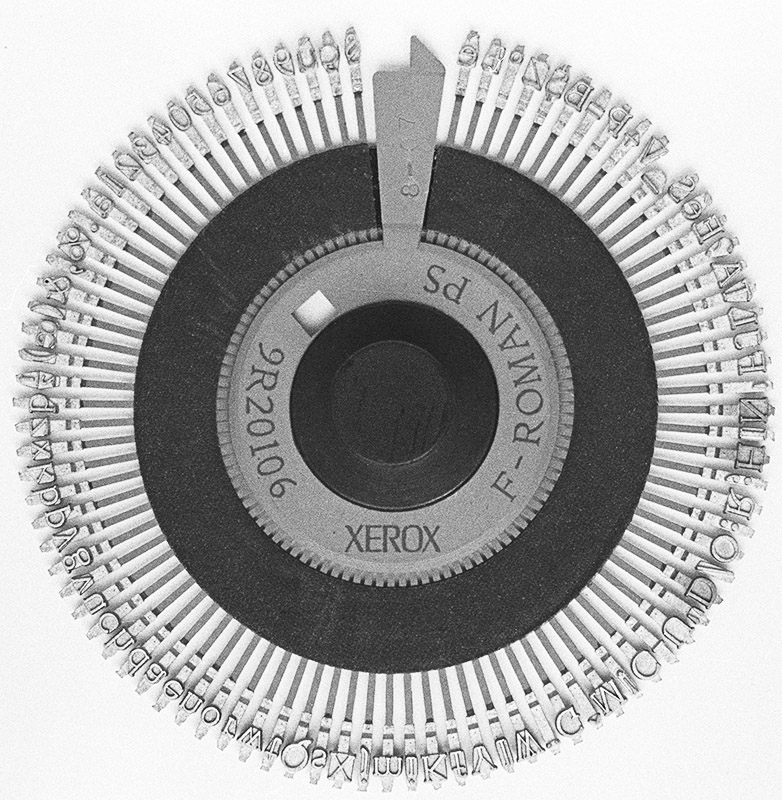
Metal Daisy Wheel for Xerox & Diablo printers

The company was best known for the HyType I and HyType II typewriter-based computer terminals, the Diablo 630 daisy wheel printers, as well as removable hard disk drives that were used in the Xerox Alto computer and resold by DEC as the RK02 and RK03.

== Overview ==
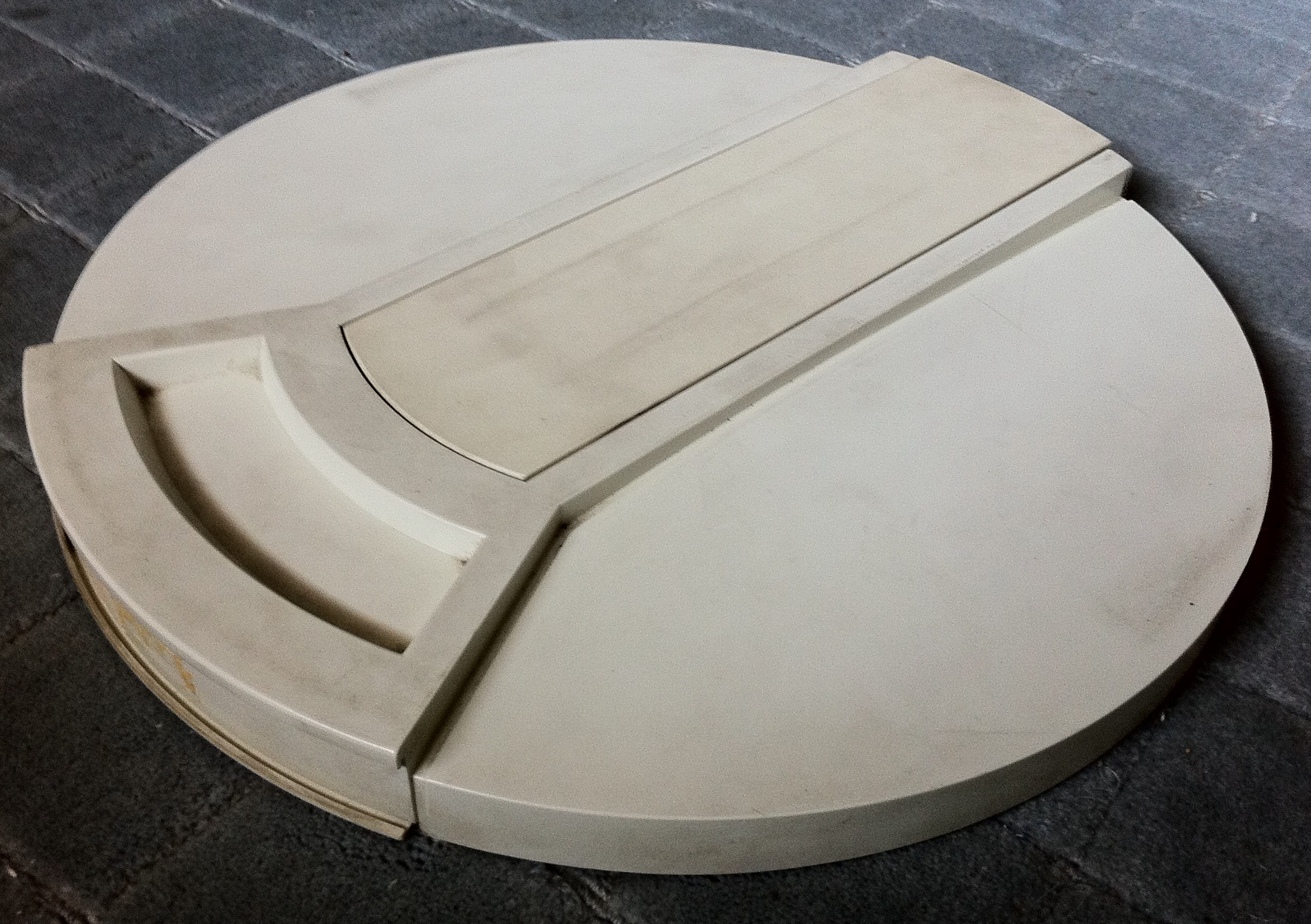
(removable) disk cartridge

The RK02 and RK03 drives that Diablo made for Digital Equipment Corporation (DEC) was described by DEC as "stores digital data in serial format on IBM 2315-type disk cartridges." They differed from what DEC later manufactured for itself, as the "RK04 and RK05 use voice coil head positioning, and the RK02 and RK03 use rack and pinion head positioning."

The RK02/RK04 were low density and stored 600K 16-bit words, whereas the RK03/RK05 store 1.2 megabytes of 16-bit words. By using "12 sectors of 128 words (low density) or 256 words (high density)" and "203 cylinders of 2 tracks per cylinder" the capacity was 1.22 megabytes or 2.45 megabytes respectively.

Diablo also made full computer systems as well as printers. Additionally, Diablo released terminal systems featuring their printing technology, including the Model 1560 Matrix Terminal. This model could connect directly to a remote machine using the Bell 103A, 113A, 202 and 212 standards, and supported a nominal 1200 baud transfer rate. It used a microprocessor in combination with mechanical linkages to allow more advanced editing and data entry.

== Diablo systems ==
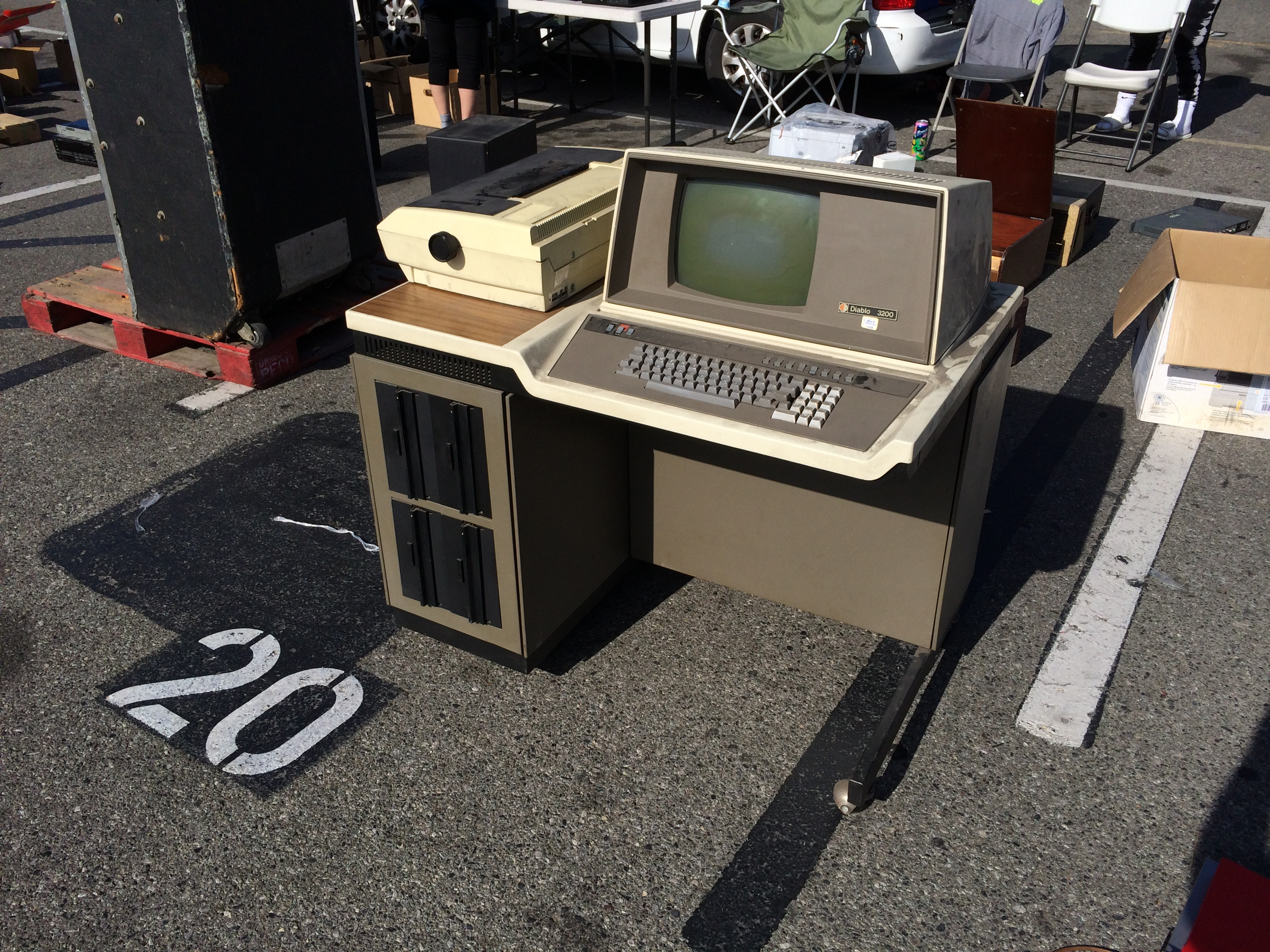
Xerox Diablo 3200

The Xerox Diablo 3100 was among the complete computing systems sold by Diablo.

== Diablo printers ==
In 1970 a team at Diablo Systems led by engineer Dr Andrew Gabor developed the first commercially successful daisy wheel printer, a device that was faster and more flexible than IBM's Selectric devices, being capable of 30 cps (characters per second), whereas the Selectric operated at 13.4 cps. Dr Andrew Gabor was issued two patents for the invention U.S. Patents 3,954,163 and 3,663,880.

Among the models for which Diablo was known were the 9R87201, the HyType I (1973) and the HyType II. Some of the printwheels were plastic, others were "metalized." Also included were the Diablo 630 and 635.
