= Qume =

Defunct computer hardware company

- Formerly: Ancilex
- Industry: Computer peripherals
- Founded: 1973; 53 years ago in Hayward, California, United States
- Founders: David S. Lee; Robert E. Schroeder
- Defunct: 1995
- Fate: Acquired by Wyse

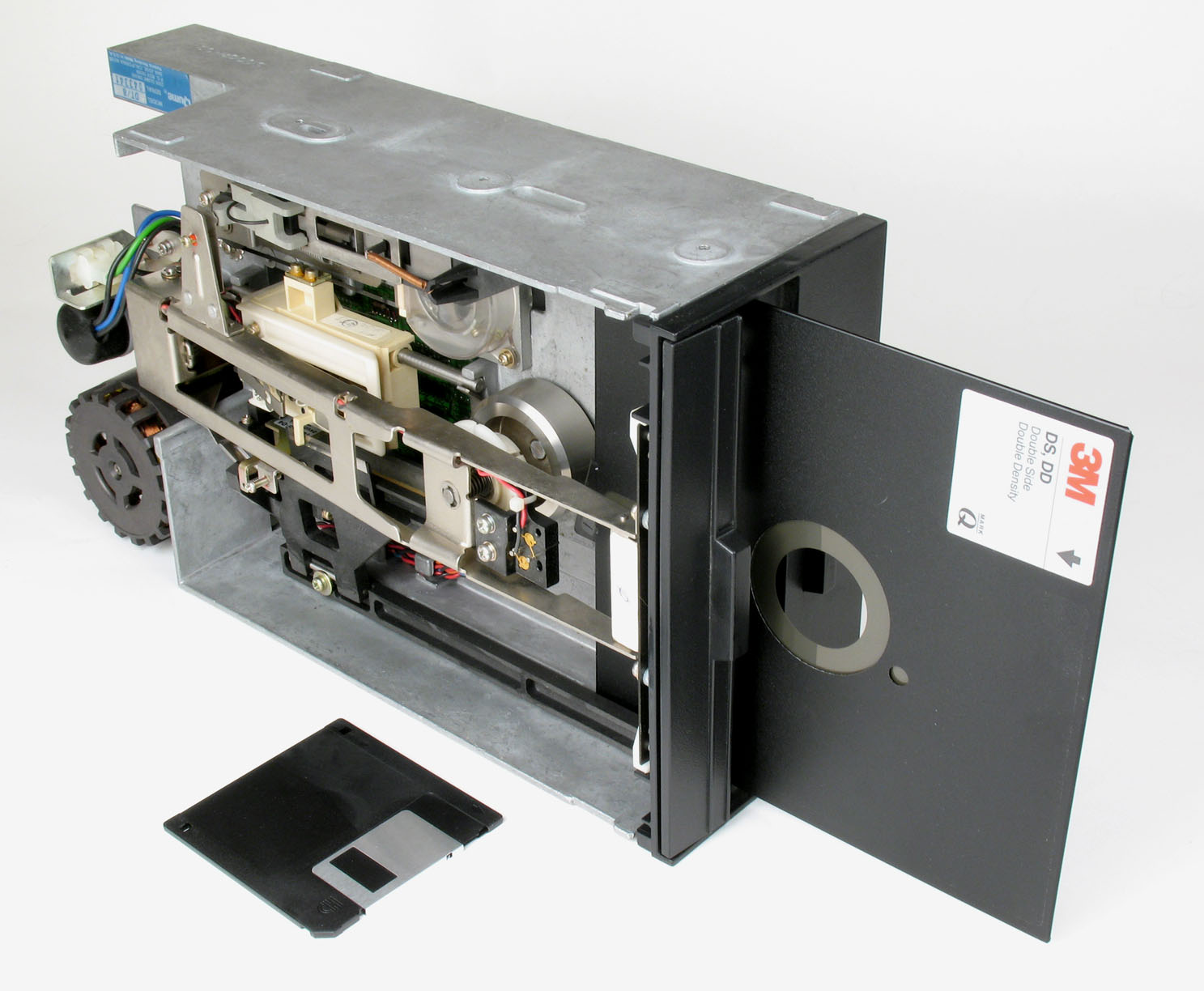
A Qume brand 8-inch floppy drive.

Qume was a manufacturer of daisy-wheel printers originally located in Hayward, California, later moving to San Jose. Around 1980, it also opened a manufacturing facility in Puerto Rico. It once dominated the daisy-wheel market. As the market for its printers declined in the 1980s, the company developed a line of computer terminals. It was founded by David S. Lee and Robert E. Schroeder in 1973, grew to become the largest printer company in the world, and was acquired by ITT Corporation for an unprecedented $164M in 1978. It remained a division of ITT until its acquisition by Wyse Technology sometime before 1995. Qume also manufactured floppy diskette drives, particularly 5.25" ones, but it also manufactured 8" diskette drives as well. Qume's diskette drives were included in some IBM PC models, such as the Portable Personal Computer and PCjr.

Qume was originally named Ancilex, but, because that name was not unique, changed its name to something that seemed like no one else would have ever used it, Qume. Amusingly, when the manufacturing plant was opened in Puerto Rico, one of the employees hired there was named Qume.

== Qume CrystalPrint ==
Towards the end of the 1980s, Qume introduced a range of printers competing with laser printers, but instead of directing a laser beam at the photosensitive drum, it employed "liquid crystal shutters" made by Casio to control the illumination of the drum by a tungsten halide lamp. Around 2,500 independent segments or shutters were used to "expose" a line across the drum, equivalent to a pass of the laser beam in a conventional laser printer.

In early 1989, two models were available. The Qume CrystalPrint WP cost around £900, featured 128 KB of RAM and only one built-in typeface, emulating only a Diablo 630 daisywheel printer. The Qume CrystalPrint Series II cost around £1400, featured 512 KB of RAM and was capable of graphical output, emulating the HP LaserJet II with an Epson emulation card available for an additional £125.

The Qume CrystalPrint Publisher, when introduced to the UK in 1989, cost £3449 and was the first model in the range to offer PostScript compatibility. The reduced price relative to most PostScript printers was attributed to the use of a "PostScript interpreter clone" together with fonts from Bitstream. The printer contained a Qume-commissioned controller board employing a Weitek chipset that was reported as interpreting "the bulk of PostScript in hardware". Performance and compatibility was well regarded, although limitations were noted around paper handling and emulations of other kinds of printers. An upgrade board was also available to give Qume CrystalPrint Series II printers PostScript compatibility.

Subsequent models in the range included the CrystalPrint Publisher II, featuring improved paper handling over its predecessor, and CrystalPrint Express, a network printer with 3 MB of RAM supplied and a 600 x 300 dpi resolution.

The CrystalPrint engine was itself used in the Computer Concepts LaserDirect printer, announced in 1990 at a price of £1148, aimed at the Acorn Archimedes range of computers. This printer was driven directly by the host computer in conjunction with an expansion card, eliminating various costs associated with conventional laser printers, specifically the hardware and software responsible for page rendering (leaving "the bare minimum of circuitry in the printer"), and took advantage of the Archimedes' ARM processor to deliver competitive printing performance, albeit requiring the host computer to hold the image of each page in its own memory. A RISC OS compatible printer driver combined with Acorn's outline font format permitted a single set of scalable fonts to be used for both screen and printer use. Calligraph's ArcLaser product, launched at around the same time, was broadly similar, and both products were regarded as "offering faster-than-Postscript speed for less-than-laserjet price".
