= IBasis =

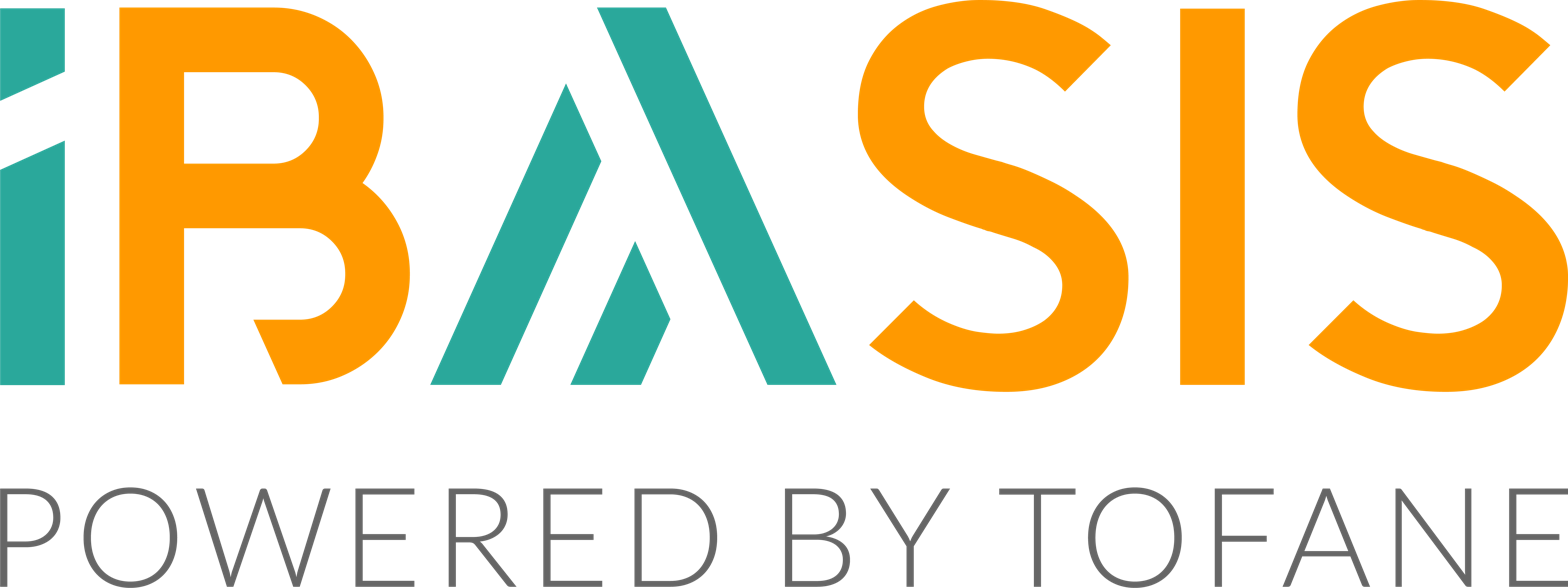
- Type: Private
- Industry: Telecommunications
- Founded: 1996
- Founder: Ofer Gneezy and Gordon VanderBrug
- Headquarters: Lexington, Massachusetts
- Services: International Voice Services, Value-added Mobile Data Services
- Revenue: 1.2 Billion USD (2010)
- Number of employees: 370 (2008)
- Parent: Tofane Global
- Website: www.ibasis.com

iBASIS is a communications provider based in Lexington, Massachusetts. iBASIS offers voice, mobile data, and IoT services. In February 2019, iBASIS was acquired by Tofane Global from KPN.

More than 1,000 mobile and fixed line telecommunications carriers and service providers outsourced some or all of their international voice traffic to iBASIS. It had one of the largest carriers of international voice traffic by 2007. iBASIS customers include many carriers, mobile operators, and emerging service providers including Verizon, Vodafone, VSNL, China Mobile, China Unicom, IDT Corporation, Qwest, Skype, Telecom Italia, and Telefonica.

The company also offers online pre-paid international calling services to business and consumer customers through a product called Pingo.

== History ==
iBASIS was founded in 1996 by Ofer Gneezy and Gordon VanderBrug to provide wholesale international long-distance services to carriers using Voice over Internet Protocol (VoIP) technology. It held an initial public offering in November 1999 and was ranked the No. 1 fastest growing company in New England for 2000, 2001 and 2002 by Deloitte & Touche.

In October 2007, iBASIS acquired KPN Global Carrier Services, the international voice business of KPN, the national carrier of the Netherlands. KPN became a majority stockholder of iBASIS as part of the transaction. The combined entity carried nearly 24 billion minutes of international voice traffic in 2007.

According to international telecom research firm TeleGeography, that resulting traffic made the new iBASIS one of the three largest carriers of international voice traffic in the world, handling a volume roughly equal to AT&T's international voice traffic and behind worldwide leader Verizon.

In April 2008, iBASIS also acquired the international wholesale voice business of TDC A/S, a Danish carrier, for $10 million cash, which added 2 billion minutes of annual traffic and was estimated to increase annual revenues by $80 million.

On December 21, 2009, iBASIS became a wholly owned subsidiary of Royal KPN N.V. (NYSE: KPN), the national carrier of the Netherlands, which marketed throughout in Europe. iBASIS is no longer a publicly traded company.

On February 8, 2019, KPN completed the sale of its iBASIS wholesale division to Tofane Global, led by Alexandre Pébereau. With Tofane's prior acquisition of Altice Europe N.V in September 2018, the combined company became the third largest wholesale voice operator, with revenues of more than $1 billion a year.

== Network and Technology ==
The iBASIS Network includes an international VoIP network with more than 1,000 points of presence in over 100 countries. iBASIS uses technology from Cisco Systems and GenBand (formerly NextPoint and NexTone) and has developed its own monitoring and route quality management systems to determine and select a suitable route for every call. The company was using GSM Association's IP eXchange, which was developed as an IP backbone for fixed and mobile service providers.

Starting around 2017, iBASIS started marketing using the term Internet of things.
