= CPT Corporation =

Producer of word processing machines

- Traded as: CPTC, National Over the Counter
- Industry: Word Processing
- Founded: 1971
- Founder: Dean Scheff
- Fate: Discontinued operations in the mid 1990s
- Headquarters: Factories in USA and Ireland, Eden Prairie, Minnesota, United States
- Area served: World wide
- Products: Stand-alone word processing machines
- Revenue: $200,000,000 annually max
- Number of employees: 2000

CPT Corporation was founded in 1971 by Dean Scheff in Minneapolis, Minnesota, with co-founders James Wienhold and Richard Eichhorn. CPT first designed, manufactured, and marketed the CPT 4200, a dual-cassette-tape machine that controlled a modified IBM Selectric typewriter to support text editing and word processing.

The CPT 4200 was followed in 1976 by the CPT VM (Visual Memory), a partial-page display-screen dual-cassette-tape unit, and shortly thereafter by the CPT 8000, a full-page display dual-diskette desktop microcomputer that drove stand-alone daisy wheel printers.

Subsequent products included (1) variants on the 8000 series; (2) the CPT 6000 series, which had a lower capacity, smaller screen, and was less expensive; (3) the CPT 9000 series, which had a larger capacity and could run IBM personal computer software; (4) the CPT Phoenix series, which had a graphical capabilities; (5) CPT PT, a software-only reduced version that ran on IBM personal computers and clones; and (6) other related products.

The CPT logo—originally three letters chosen to sound well together—began to be taken as an acronym for "cassette powered typewriting," and subsequently for "computer processed text," and numerous other variants. Major competition was IBM, Wang, Lanier, Xerox, and other word processing vendors.

CPT Corporation was fifth in size among Minnesota-based top high-tech companies, after 3M, Honeywell, Control Data, and Medtronic. Corporate revenues grew to approximately a quarter-billion dollars per year in the mid-1980s, then declined with the proliferation of personal computers. CPT ultimately ceased major manufacturing late in the 20th century.

== Selected products ==
=== Cassette based ===
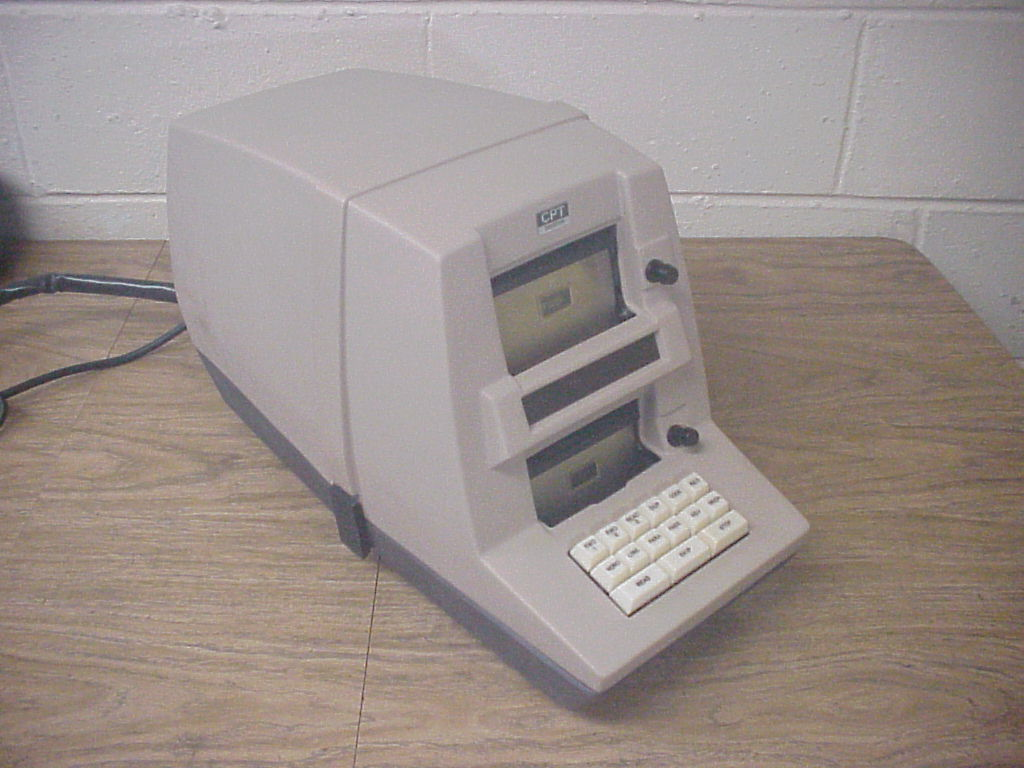
Figure 1. CPT 4200 system console

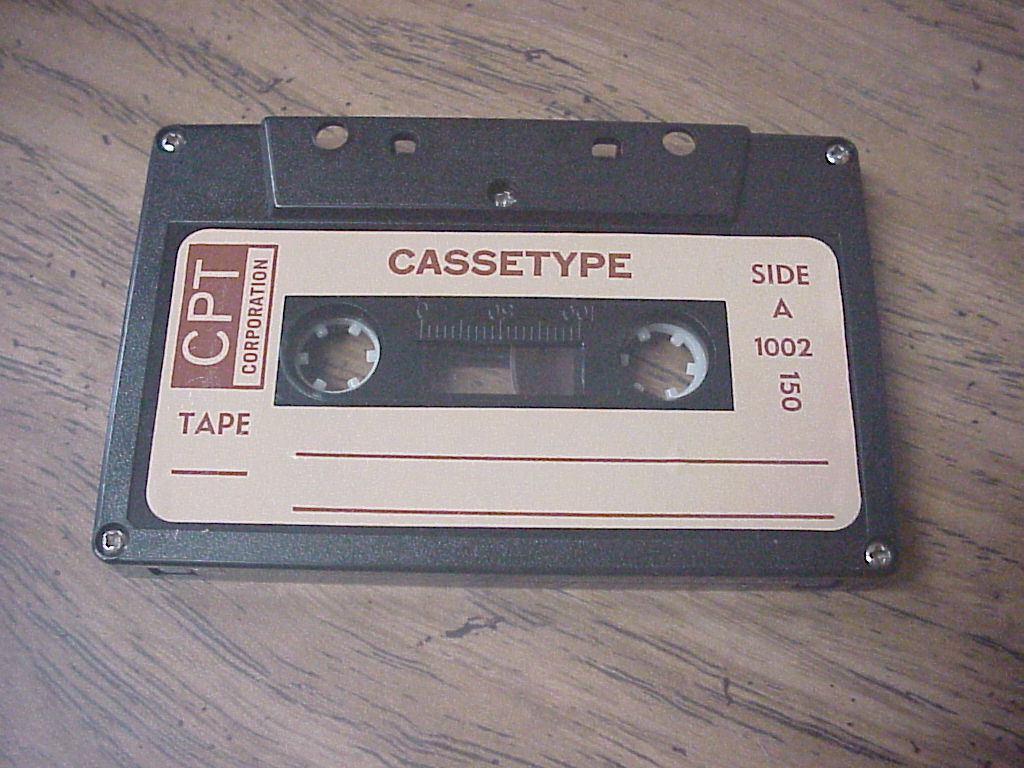
Figure 2. (Circa 1977) Cassette used for non-volatile storage of characters typed via an IBM Selectric typewriter keyboard into a CPT 4200 word processing system

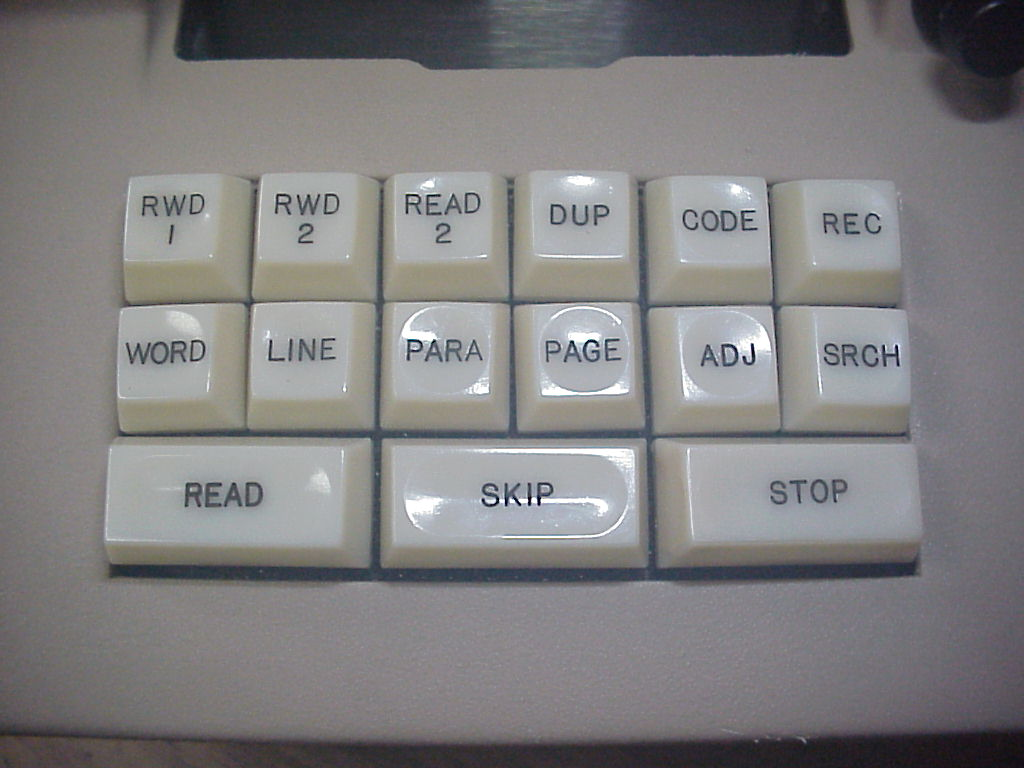
Figure 3. The CPT 4200 console control keys

The CPT 4200 was a dual-cassette-tape unit with a small built-in keyboard that controlled a modified IBM Selectric typewriter. Keystrokes entered on the typewriter appeared on the paper as they were recorded on the output cassette, which formed a magnetic replica of the characters printed on the page. That output cassette could later be used as an input cassette, where it would be played back to the typewriter along with new keystrokes to accomplish text editing.

The keyboard of the CPT 4200 had action keys for "skip", "read" and "stop", mode keys for "word", "line", "paragraph," and "page." Pressing "read" transferred a word, line, paragraph, or page (depending on which mode key had been selected) from the input tape to both the typewriter and the output tape. Line boundaries (a.k.a. printer margins) recorded on the input tape were ignored or retained depending on whether or not the "adjust" key had been selected. Alternatively, pressing "skip" moved past the corresponding amount of text on the input tape without sending it to the typewriter or to the output tape.

The Selectric's keyboard was active for any new typing, which would appear on the paper and transferred to the output tape. Thus a document was edited by reading back those parts of the text to be retained and skipping those parts to be discarded, with new typing added from the Selectric's keyboard. Price: approx. $5000, 1980-era values.

The CPT Communicator was an add-on to the CPT 4200 that allowed data to be transferred from one text-editing machine to another, or between a text-editing machine and a remote computer, via phone lines. Price: not available.

=== Microprocessor based ===
==== CPT 8000 series ====
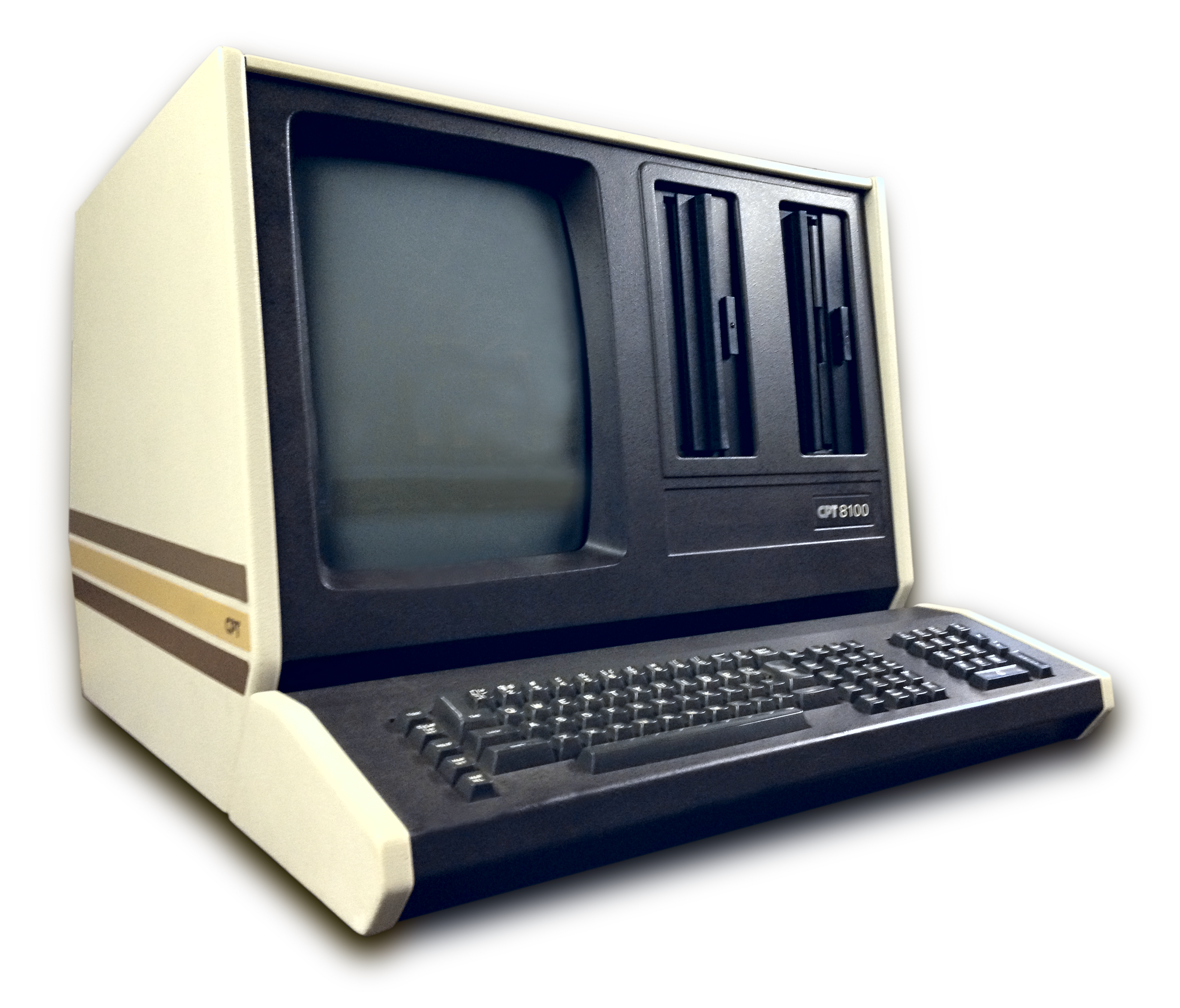
Figure 4. CPT 8000 series: Dual floppy diskette drives are to the right of a full-page cathode ray tube (CRT) display screen. The broad horizontal bar on the screen is an after-image of the lower editing window, which almost always contained text and which after years of editing left an impression on the screen's luminescent phosphors. A daisy-wheel printer was a separate cable-connected device, not shown.

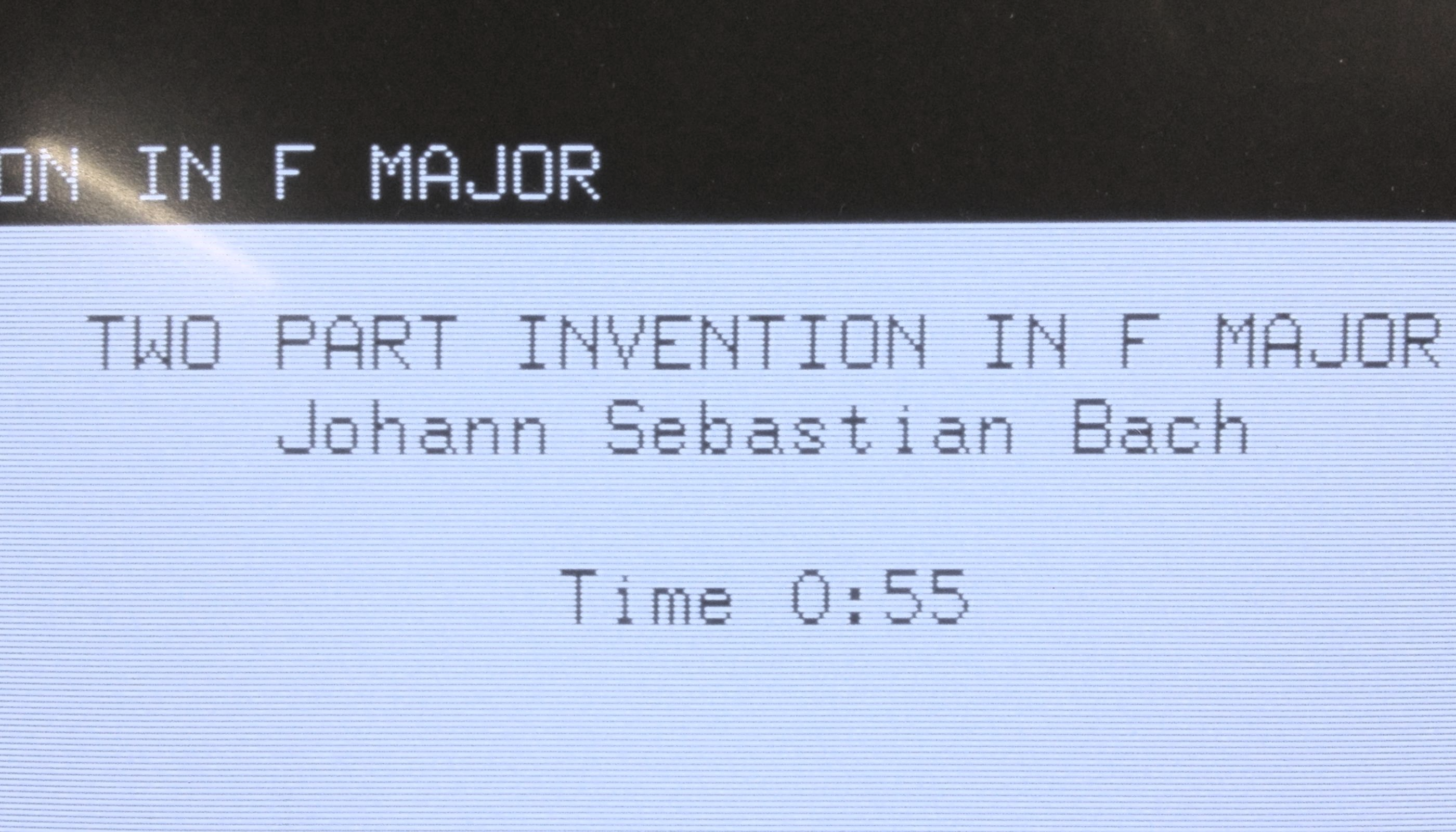
Figure 5. CPT screen: Closeup photograph of the CPT 8000-series display screen. This screen introduced the fast white phosphor P104 in 1976, which was intended to allow rapid scrolling without blurring. That phosphor subsequently became a standard in the word processing industry and elsewhere.

The CPT 8000 was the company's first microcomputer product, exhibited in spring of 1976. It was a self-contained desktop machine with two 8-inch floppy diskette drives, a movable keyboard, and a full-page vertically oriented CRT display simulating paper with black characters on a white background, for a wysiwyg view of text on paper. It was promoted as familiar and easy to use for those experienced with typewriters. A keyboard with a large set of extra keys made operating the 8000 quite easy even for people without any computer skills or background. IN, OUT, PRINT, OOPS *OOPS was changed thinking it was insulting to the buyer to assume they would ever make an error.

The CPT 8000 was designed to show a full page of text with a static line showing the margin and tab stops. An additional line would display status or error messages with a times square like display. The text page could both smooth pan and scroll by the hardware in the display board. The 8000 ran its own multitasking hardware interrupt-driven operating system and could also run CP/M. Unlike other Wordprocessor only systems, CPT's system that could run any of the many popular CP/M applications. Using the CP/M OS users could develop Fortran, CBasic, Cobol and other language's programs.

The 8000 used Intel's 8080 microprocessor. The display board was bleeding-edge, high-speed logic. The parts available at this time were pushed to their limits to provide the speed needed to display this much text. There were times that batches of parts from one manufacturer simply could not be clocked as fast as the 8000 display required. Memory was initially 64K, but larger boards of 128K were most common then later 256K were offered. The 8080 accessed this additional RAM by running a custom page flipping circuit. The 8000 was originally priced at $8000 and its daisy wheel printer an additional $8000. The model number having been confused with the price at its first appearance at the Hanover fair.

An RS-232 serial communication option was available for the 8000 series that allowed the electronic transfer of documents. One very popular use of this was to access the Westlaw system.

A tempest approved version of the 8000 was developed that was RF tight with nothing being emitted that could be monitored or spied on.

=== Storage Systems ===
==== CPT WordPak ====
The CPT WordPak series was CPT's first external document storage system that enabled multiple 8000 series workstations to store documents in an electronic filing cabinet.

Prior to WordPak, all documents were stored on removable 8-inch floppy diskettes. Sharing documents involved handing off the original disk, or copying the document to a second disk and 'sneaker-net-ing' (walking it over) to the second 8000. But this resulted in two copies of the document, one at each workstation.

A circuit board with a proprietary cable connector was installed in the 8000/6000 family of "workstations" and connected to the WordPak by a multi-conductor cable.

WordPak 1 consisted of a single Shugart Associates SA4000 14"-diameter hard disk with a capacity of 30 megabytes.

WordPak 2 added a 2nd drive for a total of 60 megabytes.

==== CPT SRS 45 ====
The CPT SRS 45 was one of the first servers, but had a few other functions. It was a networking shared resource system. It combined a ZIP drive for backup and hard disk(s) that would be shared simultaneously by up to eight CPT machines that had the PC AT bus. The primary person responsible for its development was Bill Davidson whose wife Cheryl was responsible for bringing up CP/M, MP/M and other Digital Research products running on the Phoenix. The system worked with networking cards that plugged into the individual machines. These used the 55AA installable driver of the IBM BIOS to simply add the zip and hard disk drives to each computers drives list. So a system that started with floppy drives A and B and a C hard disk on the machine would have the SRS 45 drives added as drives D (E, F depending on the number of hard disk) and Z for the zip drive. Sharing (avoiding writing to the same file at the same time) was handled by assigning parts of the drives for individuals and other directories for shared use. No "driver" software was needed. You plugged in the networking card and your machine had additional drives that were internal to the SRS45. The SRS45 as were all CPT machines not just dedicated Word Processors.

=== Personal-computer based ===
==== CPT PT software ====
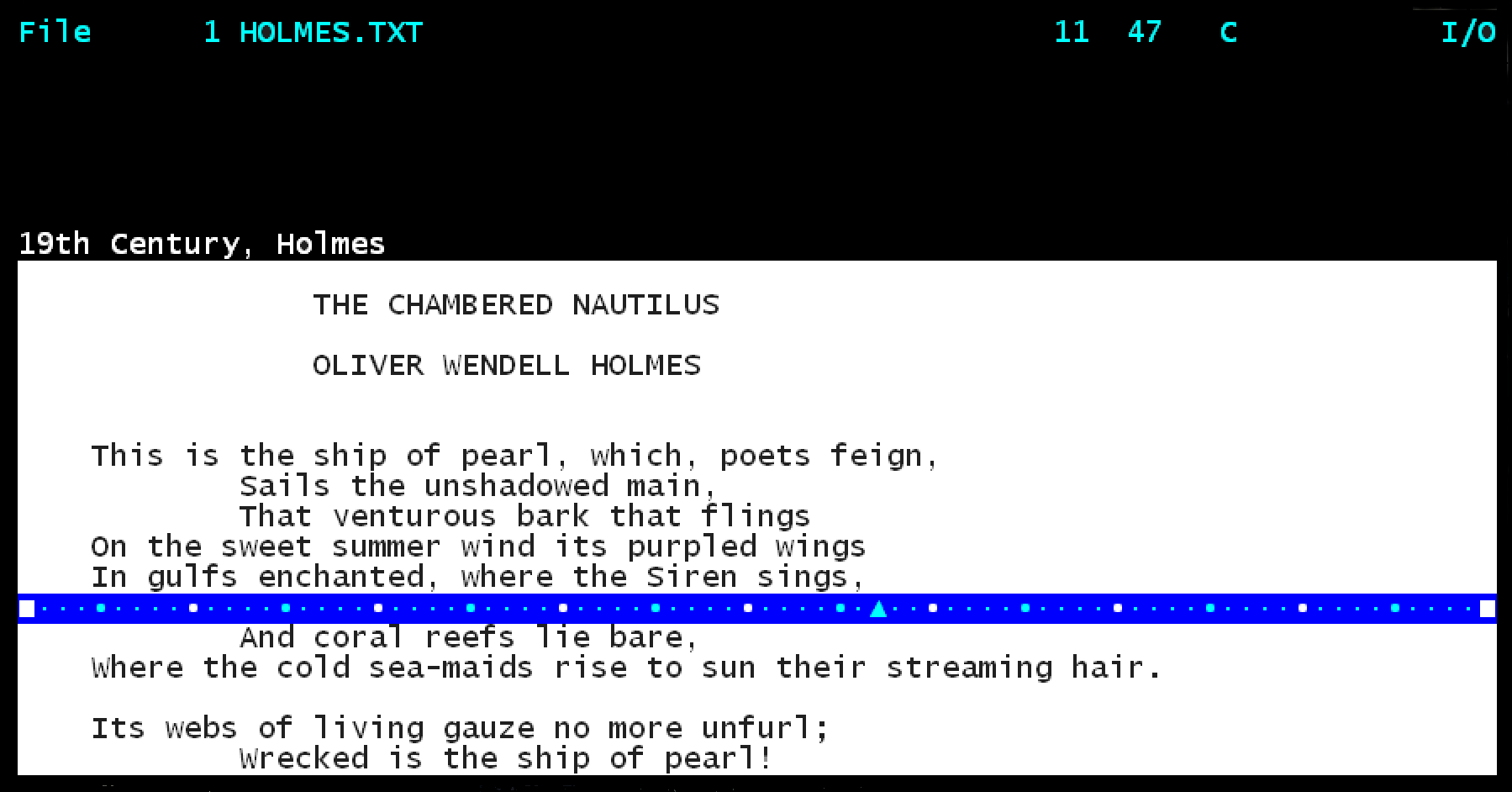
Figure 7. CPT PT screen: The screen fit the 80-character-wide by 25-line-high screen of the IBM-PC. A blue "margin scale" divides the upper and lower editing windows. The black area at the top of the upper window is outside the bounds of the paper. File name, line and column numbers, and other codes are light blue at the far top. The typing area remains above the blue margin scale, while the white page-area slides up and down, adjusting the black area as it moves.

CPT PT was a reduced a version of the software that ran under MS-DOS as an application on IBM PC compatible computers. The corporation intended it as a bridge to allow data to flow in and out of personal computer packages, as well as providing a personal-computer word processing application for those familiar with standalone CPT equipment or who preferred the CPT style of dual-window text editing. Price: approx. $200, 1980-era values.

==== CPT Genius Display ====
The Genius display was a stand-alone, vertically oriented (portrait) configuration monochrome grey-scale CRT monitor unit and an IBM PC form factor display card to allow high-resolution, full-page text & graphics on IBM PC compatible computers. A special MS-DOS driver was required, but allowed a text screen to be 80 characters wide and 66 lines tall (a normal printed page parameters). The display unit looked similar to that of the Phoenix monitor (minus the keyboard) shown in Figure 6 above.

Text editors such as Quicksoft's PC-Write, WordPerfect, WordStar, VolksWriter (and more) supported the full-page mode. Lotus Symphony and 1-2-3 would support full-page as well as dual-screen mode (2 'regular' landscape screens, one in the top half of the screen with the other below.

Windows 3.0 drivers were also developed for this product that allowed for full-page screen presentations, just like their dedicated word processors, but with the addition of monochrome graphics.

Some specifications:

9x15 pixel character cell

8x12 pixel character matrix, includes 3 scan line for descenders (i.e. letters g,j,p...)

13th scan line for underscore

progressive scan, 60 Hz vertical refresh rate

64 kHz horizontal scan rate

100 MHz video bandwidth

15" diagonal, 110 degree deflection, paper white, long persistence phosphor

(from at-the-time marketing literature)

The product was originally developed by Micro Display Systems of Hastings Minnesota as the VHR-400. Price: $1500

=== Hardcopy Printers ===
==== Daisy Wheel Printers ====
Daisy wheel printers from Qume Corporation and Diablo Systems could be connected to the 8000 and 8500 series word processors. These printers could support both fixed pitch and proportional fonts, but could not print graphics/pictures. Price: unknown

==== Laser Printers ====
Laser printers were required for printing the documents produced by the Phoenix series word processors as the documents produced could contain embedded graphics. Price: unknown

== Nameplates of selected products ==
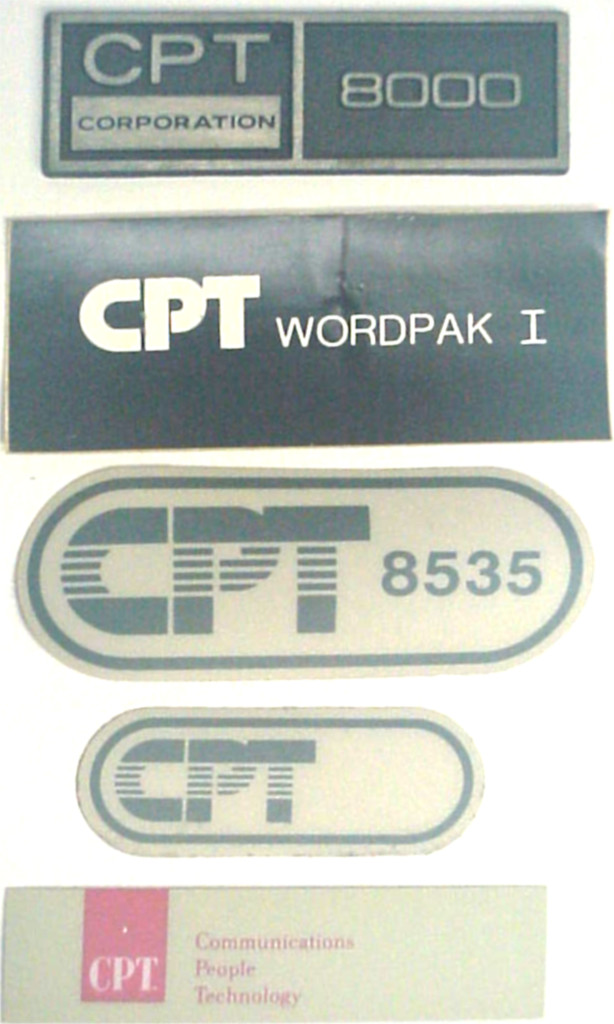
These are some of the product labels that were applied to various products produced in the 1980s by CPT Corporation (Minneapolis, MN, USA)
