= Diablo 630 =

Daisy wheel printer

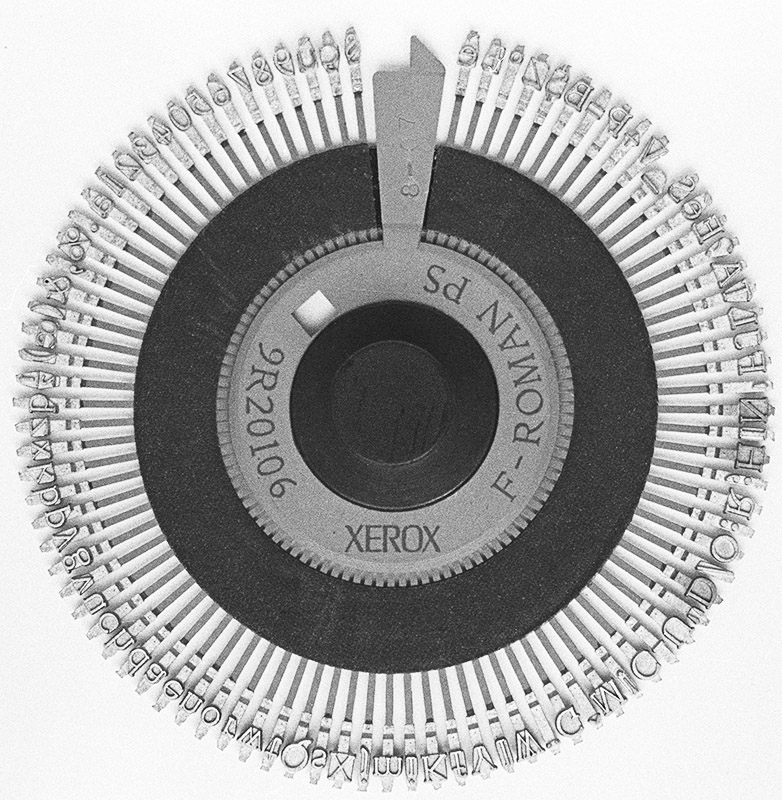
Metal daisy wheel for Xerox and Diablo printers

The Diablo 630 is a discontinued daisy wheel style computer printer sold by the Diablo Data Systems division of the Xerox Corporation beginning in 1980. The printer is capable of letter-quality printing; that is, its print quality is equivalent to the quality of an IBM Selectric typewriter or printer, the de facto quality standard of the time.

== Overview ==
The printer is capable of this quality at a nominal speed of 30 characters per second (roughly twice the speed of the Selectric). Several technologies were introduced to enable this quality and speed:

- The lightweight daisy wheel is rotated by a closed-loop servo and can be positioned rapidly and accurately. Because the wheel can turn in either direction, the next character is never more than 180° away from the previous character (and related characters are grouped together so the average "seek" is much less than 180°).

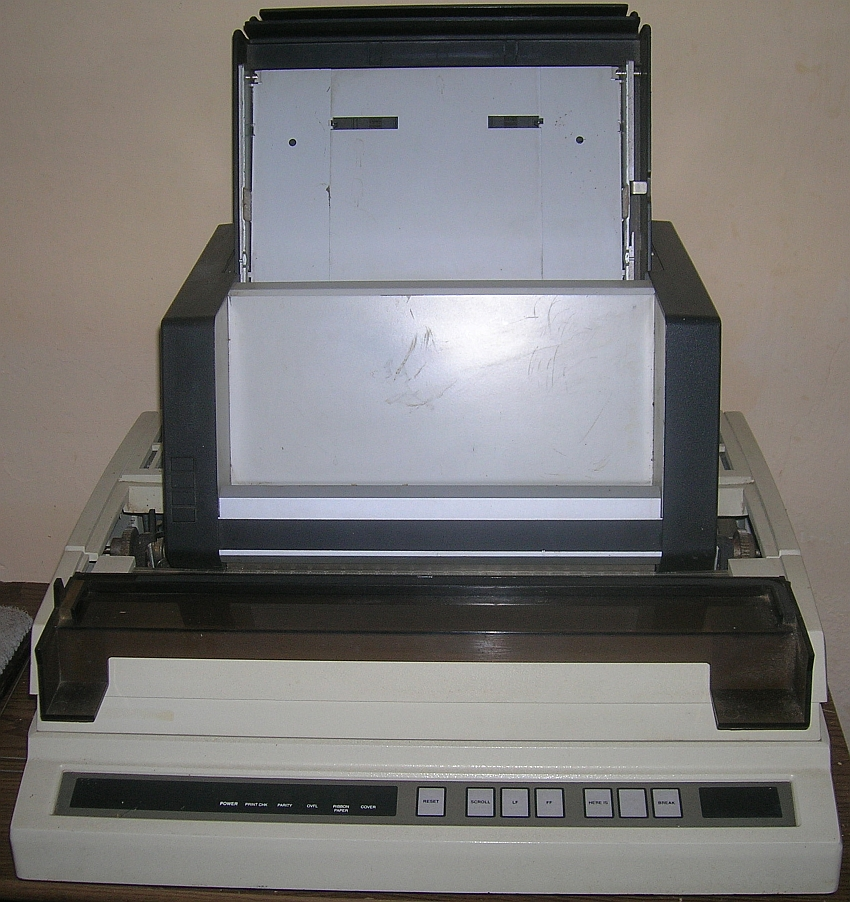
Diablo 630 with mounted sheet feeder, Model 630, production year 1981

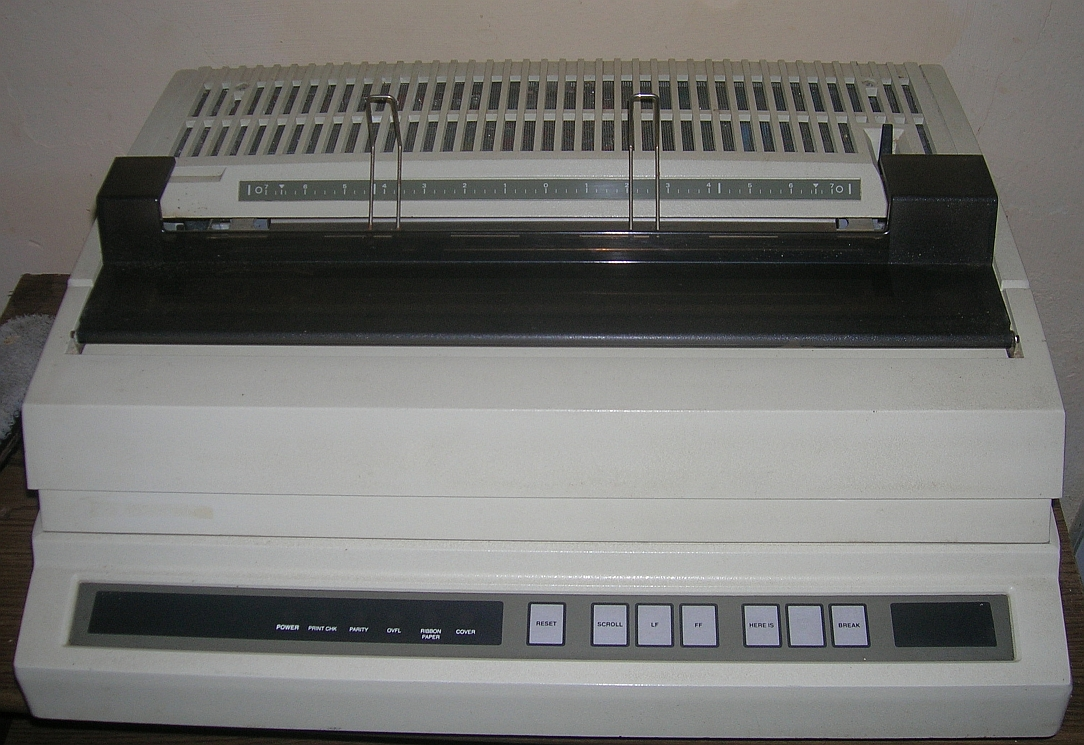
Diablo 630 without sheet feeder, Model 630, production year 1981

- Like the "typeball" element on a Selectric, the daisy wheel can be easily changed, allowing for a wide variety of fonts and character pitches.
- Some models, the 630ECS (Extended Character Set) can use wheels with two rows of characters, allowing for the machine to print in two different languages or with a large set of special symbols. The entire extended ASCII character set, introduced on the IBM PC, could be printed with the appropriate print wheel.
- The printer uses cartridge-loaded ribbons; both an economical endless cloth ribbon and a high-quality single-use film ribbon were available, with colored ribbons provided by third parties. By contrast, Selectric-based printers can use only one type of ribbon—cloth or single-use carbon film—and were almost always equipped for the former for economic reasons.
- The carriage is also servo-controlled and the printer can print with the carriage moving either forward or backward, saving most of the time that would otherwise be spent executing carriage returns.
- The servo control of the carriage permitted the use of proportionally spaced fonts, wherein each character does not have to occupy the same amount of horizontal space.
- Unlike Selectric-based printers, daisy wheel printers support the entire ASCII printing character set.
- Bidirectional paper motion is similarly servo-controlled, allowing quick printing of subscripts and superscripts as well as fast slewing past white space.
- Servo control of both paper and carriage permitted the unit to be used for plotting, with resolution of 120×48 steps per inch. This was popular enough that special daisy wheels were made with a reinforced period (.), the character most often used for plotting.
- The logic permits simultaneous motion of the wheel, the carriage, and the paper. The hammer automatically strikes only after all three motions complete. This minimized the time spent waiting for the motions to complete.
- Originally, the 630 could be ordered with either a Centronics or an RS-232 interface. Later, the API (All Purpose Interface) was introduced and RS-232, Centronics, and GPIB (IEEE 488) were available on every printer, selected with the use of a specific cable (see page 21 of https://www.hartetechnologies.com/manuals/Diablo/Diablo_630_Printer-Terminal_Manual.PDF).

A related model, the Diablo 1620, includes a keyboard and strongly resembles a slightly overgrown Selectric typewriter. In fact, a "local/remote" switch permits it to be used as an offline typewriter as well as an interactive computer terminal. Unfortunately for a typist (in either role), the daisy wheel mechanism hides the area just printed. Firmware in the machine makes the carriage move quickly to the right of the typing position, revealing the most recently typed characters, after a few moments of inactivity. The result was still unsatisfactory to many users. Only a very slow typing speed would allow the wheel to get out of the way after every character; faster typing speeds resulted in the wheel continuously hiding the typed copy until the typist paused. This made checking the copy for errors a bit more awkward and slow than on actual typewriters or on Selectric-based terminals.

The same mechanism was used in Xerox's 850 display typing system and 860 IPS word processor, and was also sold to OEMs. One notable user was Digital Equipment Corporation, who resold the printer as the LQP01 (with a parallel interface) and the LQPSE (with an RS-232 serial interface), supported by Digital's WPS-8 word processing software. Hewlett Packard sold the 630 as the 2601A .

The printer became so common, with so much software supporting its command language, that Diablo emulation became an expected feature on other daisy-wheel printers and even on early laser printers. This was so pervasive that at least one company lived by testing printers for full Diablo 630 compatibility.
