= Vari-Typer =

Varityper
- Formerly: Vari-Typer corporation (1947–1956), Ralph C. Coxhead Corporation (1933–1947), Hammond Typewriter Company (1880–1922, 1922–1933)
- Company type: Privately held company
- Industry: Typewriter/typesetting machine manufacture
- Founded: 1880 as the Hammond Typewriter Company in New York City, US
- Founder: James Bartlett Hammond
- Headquarters: Delaware
- Area served: USA
- Products: Hammond Typewriter, Vari-Typer composing typewriters and typesetters

Vari-Typer is the brand name of a variable-spacing typewriter used between the 1930s and the early 1980s in printing, as well as for the production of office documents of typographic quality.

== Operating principles ==
Unlike the ordinary typewriter, which for mechanical practicality creates characters occupying the same lateral space as one another – the mechanisms creating the typed character and advancing the document are usually decoupled – the Vari-Typer assigned more or less lateral space to each character according to its shape, e.g. a semicolon ";" may occupy less lateral space than a "w", as in formal typography. It was also possible to change the style of characters typed, for example to italicize or to insert a bold title.

== History and timeline ==
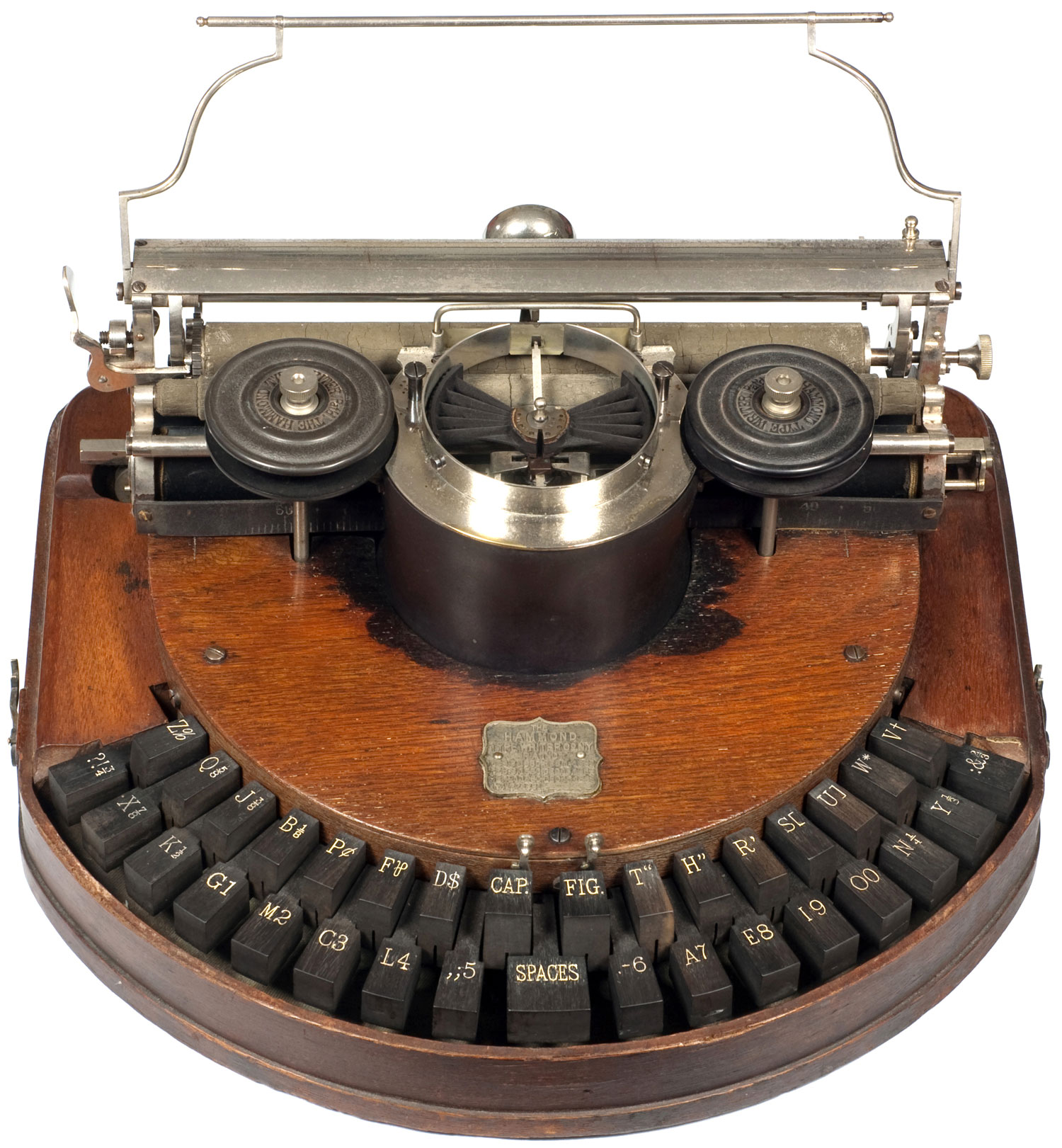
Hammond 1 typewriter, 1885

The first typewriter with proportional spacing and interchangeable characters was developed in the 1880s by James Bartlett Hammond. Marketed in the United States and Europe, Hammond's machine enjoyed some success. It was then developed by the Hepburn company, which went bankrupt in 1933. The business was then taken over by Ralph C. Coxhead, who marketed the machine first under the name Coxhead Composing Machine, then under the name Vari-Typer. On Coxhead's death, the company was acquired by Addressograph-Multigraph, which originally manufactured duplicators and desktop offset presses, and then began to diversify into the field of typesetting.

Addressograph-Multigraph grew into AM International, who would modify the brand name first to VariTyper, and later to Varityper, launched its first phototypesetter, the AM 725 model, in 1967. Varityper machine production ended in 1978, with the end of Varityper typeface production following eight years later. Varityper was sold to Tegra, Inc – in 1988 they purchased the company's assets, and in 1994, the Varityper brand name.

Varityper machines, and proportional spacing typewriters in general, were overtaken during the 1970s by word processing systems which constituted one of the foundations of the new sector of office automation then emerging with the adoption of microelectronics facilitating straightforward automated justification of text.

== Usage ==
Used mainly in small printing houses for small-scale commercial work, in integrated printed matter for the production of office documents, or even by secretaries for the typing of quality documents, the Vari-Typer was the ideal complement to the small offset presses that were beginning to spread in these same sectors. It offered an inexpensive way to compose typographic-quality texts for printing. For some categories of work, they also saved paper because a text composed in this way took up significantly less space than the same text typed in monospace (i.e. not justified), while also increasing in readability.

The Vari-Typer was straightforward to use, allowing significant time savings for work of average quality. In 1950, Princetown University Press estimated the average cost of a technical book (composition on Linotype and letterpress printing) at $600. The cost of the same work done on a justifying typewriter and printed in offset was $380. Thus, some work traditionally entrusted to printers could be recovered by the offices (reports, simple forms, etc.).

However, the machines also came with some disadvantages. Their construction being relatively delicate, they were not especially suited for intensive use: misalignment of mechanisms resulting in minor variations in the vertical positioning of the letters were common, with the results easily identifiable by the reader's eye. Similarly, to justify a text it was necessary to type it twice, once in monospace, then again, with the calculations necessary for the justification taken into account. To avoid this problem it was often planned to leave the text monospaced, and it is possible that the use of justifying typewriters (such as IBM's Selectric Composer) contributed to the gradual understanding of the merits of unjustified texts, a style of presentation traditionally rejected by typographers and printers.

This simplifying of the work of justified typesetting with typewriters and offset printing did not go unnoticed by the leaders of some press companies. During the 1926 general strike in Britain, The Times continued to issue a two-page double-sided edition "printed" on a Multigraph duplicator and printed in 48,000 copies. Almost a quarter of a century later, during a national strike in 1947, and again in Chicago in 1949, during the composers' strike against the Taft-Hartley Act that abolished the union monopoly on hiring, several dailies used Vari-Typers to ensure their production. Although some North American newspapers (in Canada, Florida, Texas and New Jersey, for example) were encouraged enough by this experience to equip themselves with IBM Selectric Composers and Proportional Spacing Typewriters to escape the control of the book syndicate, typewriter-type typesetters eventually proved unsuited to the rigors of the daily press – the quality of the letters was insufficient, the photoengraving processes used were not fast enough and the deadlines imposed by the new organization of work did not suit advertisers.
