= IBM Selectric =

Line of electric typewriters by IBM

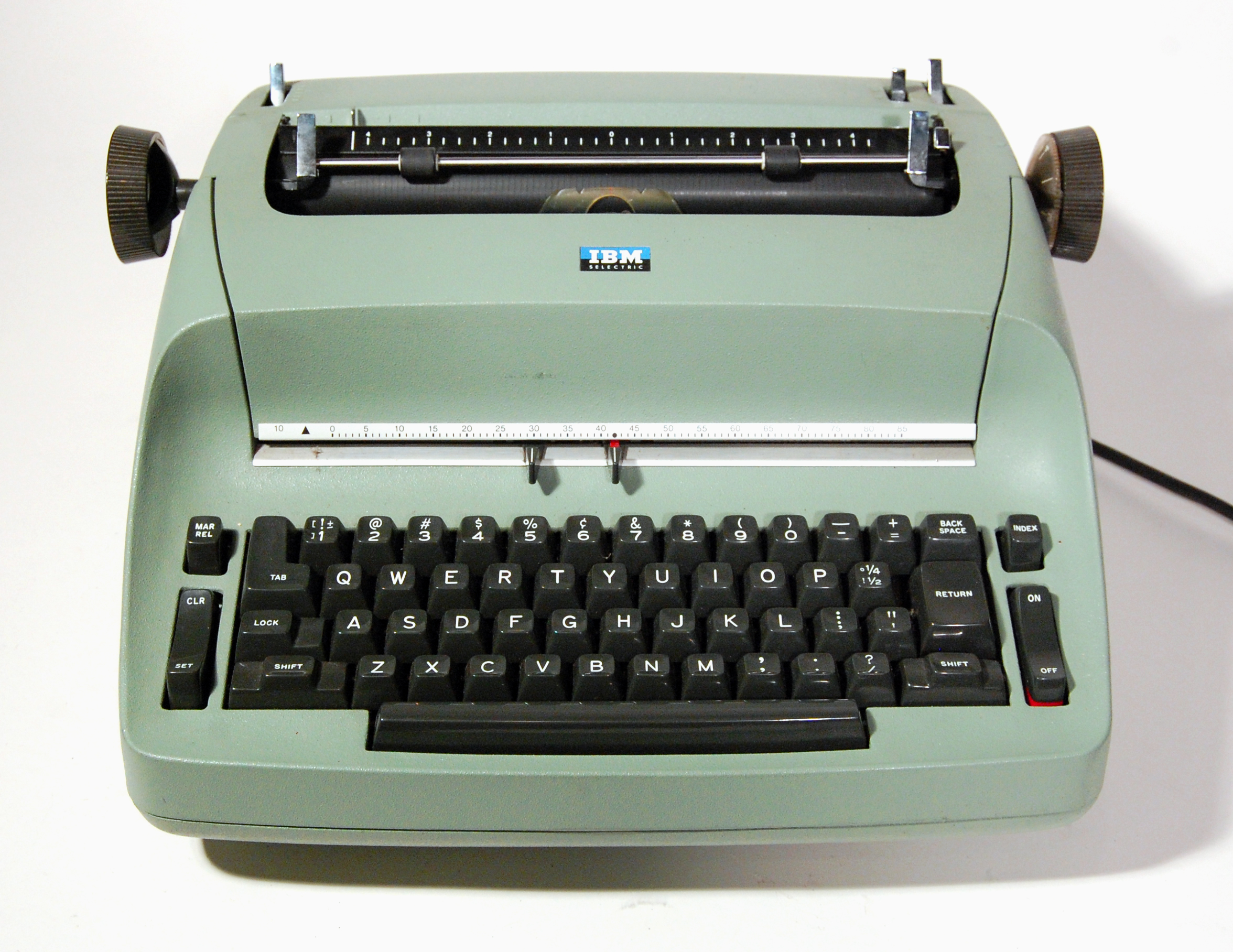
- IBM Selectric I
- Manufacturer: International Business Machines Corporation (IBM)
- Type: Electric typewriter
- Released: July 31, 1961; 65 years ago
- Discontinued: June 30, 1987; 39 years ago
- Predecessor: IBM Electric and Electromatic typewriters
- Successor: IBM Wheelwriter
- Related: IBM MT/ST and MT/SC, IBM MC (external storage options)

The IBM Selectric (a portmanteau of "selective" and "electric") was a highly successful line of electric typewriters introduced by IBM in 1961.

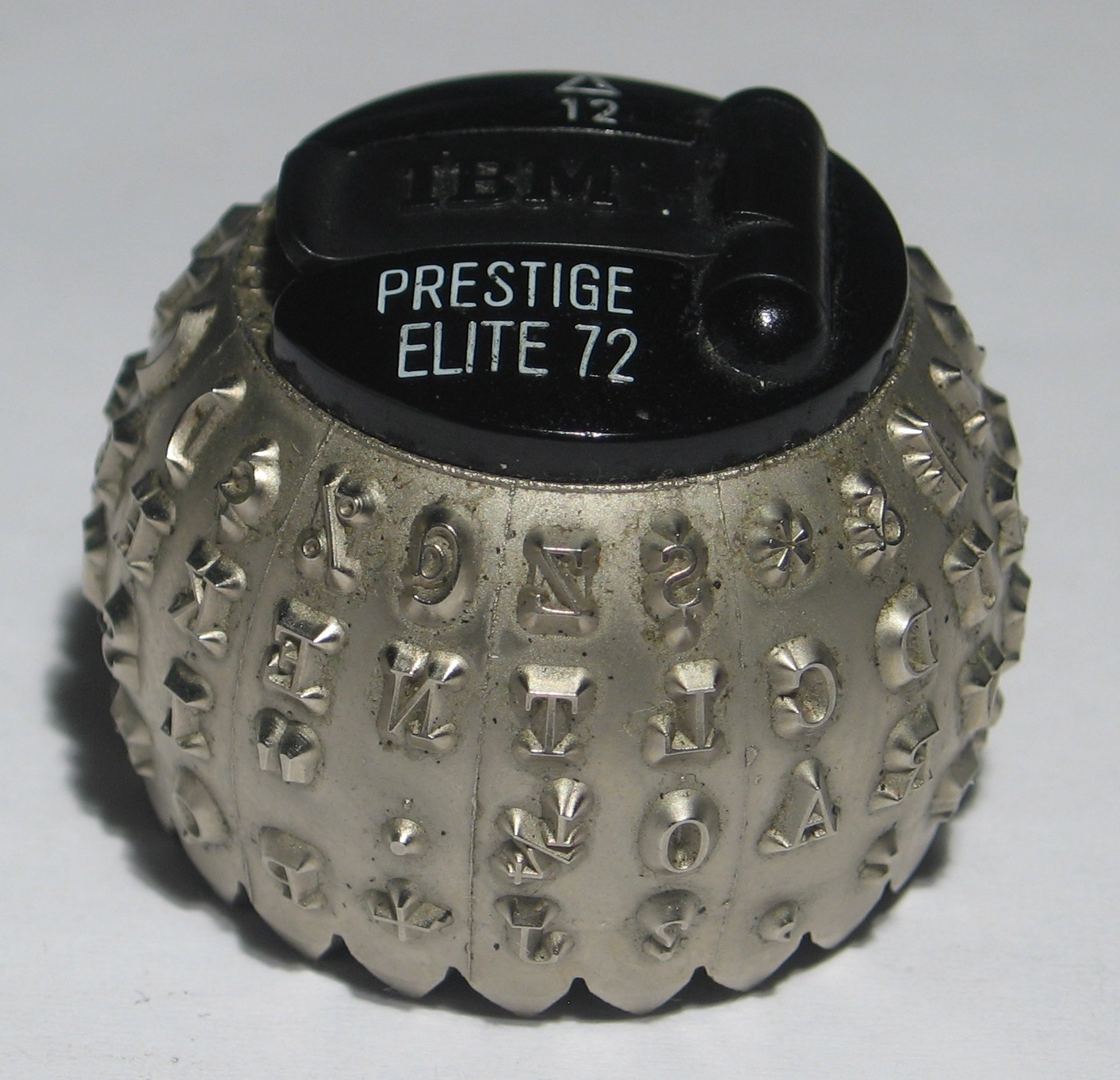
A Selectric typing element

Instead of the "basket" of individual typebars that swung up to strike the ribbon and page in a typical typewriter of the period, the Selectric had a chrome-plated plastic "element" (frequently called a "typeball", or less formally, and in 20th-century computer terminology, a "golf ball") that rotated and tilted to the correct position before striking the paper. The element could be easily interchanged to use different fonts within the same document typed on the same typewriter, resurrecting a capability that had been pioneered by typewriters such as the Hammond and Blickensderfer in the late 19th century.

The Selectric also replaced the traditional typewriter's horizontally moving carriage with a roller (platen) that turned to advance the paper vertically while the typeball and ribbon mechanism moved horizontally across the paper. The Selectric mechanism was notable for using internal mechanical binary coding and two mechanical digital-to-analog converters, called whiffletree linkages, to select the character to be typed.

The three models of Selectric eventually captured 75 percent of the United States market for electric typewriters used in business. By the Selectric's 25th anniversary in 1986, a total of more than 13 million machines had been made and sold.

By the 1970s and 1980s, the typewriter market had matured under the market dominance of large companies in the US and Europe. The Selectric would eventually face direct major competition from electronic typewriters designed and manufactured in Asia, including from Brother Industries and Silver Seiko Ltd. of Japan. The Selectric line was succeeded by the IBM Wheelwriter in 1984 before being discontinued in 1987. IBM spun off its typewriter business to the newly formed Lexmark in 1991.

== History, models, and related machines ==
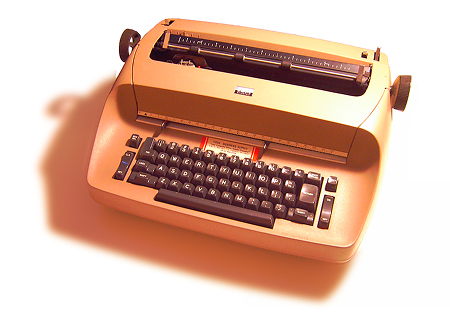
IBM Selectric I

=== Original Selectric ===
The Selectric typewriter was introduced by IBM on July 31, 1961. Its industrial design is credited to influential American designer Eliot Noyes, who had worked on a number of design projects for IBM. Prior to his work on the Selectric, he had been commissioned in 1956 by Thomas J. Watson Jr. to create IBM's first house style. These influential efforts, in which Noyes collaborated with Paul Rand, Marcel Breuer, and Charles Eames, have been referred to as the first "house style" program in American business.

=== Selectric II ===
IBM Selectric II (with dual Latin/Hebrew element and keyboard). The switch to the right of the backspace key shifts the machine to right-to-left typing, as is required for Hebrew. Note also the two typing position scales, one numbered left to right, the other right to left.

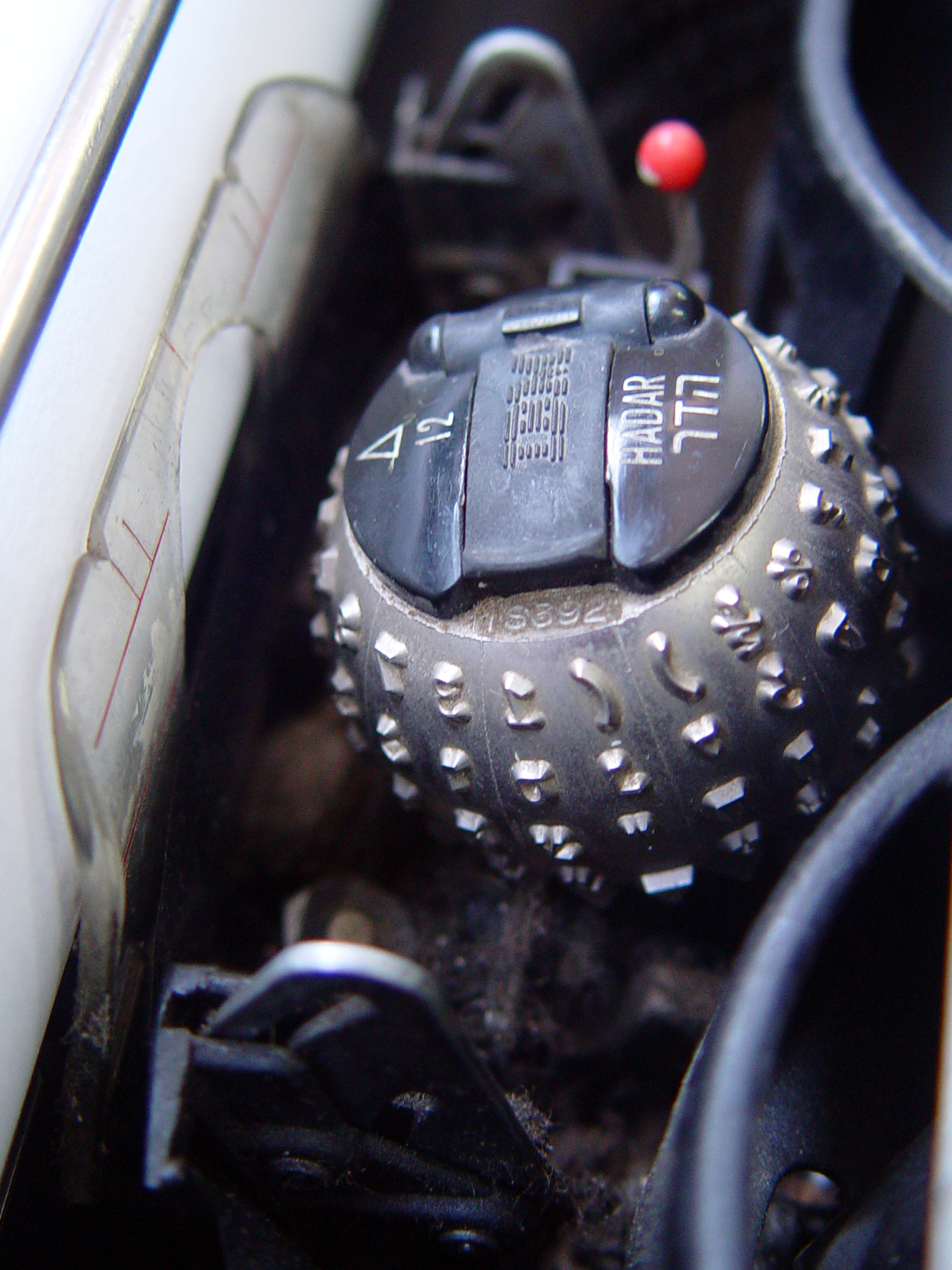
Selectric II dual Latin/Hebrew Hadar element

The Selectric remained unchanged until 1971, when the Selectric II was introduced. The original design was thereafter referred to as the Selectric I. These machines used the same 88-character typing elements, but differed from each other in many respects:

- The Selectric II was available with a Dual Pitch option to allow it to be switched (with a lever at the top left of the "carriage") between 10 and 12 characters per inch, whereas the Selectric I was ordered with one "pitch" or the other. Separate elements were available for each pitch. In a few cases, the same typeface was available in both pitches; for example, "Courier 72" was the 10-pitch variant of "Courier 12".
- The Selectric II had a lever (at the top left of the "carriage") that allowed characters to be shifted as much as half a space to the left (for centering text, or for inserting a word one character longer or shorter in place of a deleted mistake), whereas the Selectric I did not. This option was available only on dual-pitch models.
- Stylistically, the Selectric II was squarer at the corners, whereas the Selectric I was rounder.

=== Correcting Selectric II ===
In 1973, the Correcting Selectric II was announced. It added an internal correction feature to the Selectric II, intended to eliminate the need for typists to use cover-up tape, "white-out" correction fluid, or typewriter erasers. The carriage on this machine held both the main typing ribbon cartridge and two small spools for a correction ribbon. A new ribbon type, the Correctable Film ribbon, was introduced at the same time. This produced typing quality equal to the carbon film ribbon, but with a pigment designed to be easily removed from paper.

There were two types of correction tapes: the transparent and slightly adhesive "Lift-Off" tape (for use with the correctable film ribbon), or the white "Cover-Up" tape (for cloth, Tech-3, and carbon film ribbons). The spent correction tape was changed independently from the typing ribbon.

The correction key (an extra key at the bottom right of the keyboard) backspaced the carriage by one space and also put the machine in a mode wherein the next character typed would use the correction tape instead of the normal ribbon, and furthermore would not advance the carriage. The typist would press (and release) the correction key and then re-type the erroneous character, either lifting it off the page or (if using other than the correctable ribbon) covering it with white pigment, then type the correct character. Any number of mistakes could be corrected this way, but the process was entirely manual, as the machine had no memory of the typed characters.

The Selectric II had been announced and was in production when a cam timing issue was identified. The type head ball would strike the character and leave small remnants of ink of the character that was meant to be erased. A lower level engineer, Joe L. Vaughan, overheard the top engineers discussing the issue and offered a solution. Parts were machined for a change to the cam mechanism without introducing any further delays to production, and the fix was a success. Vaughan was recognized for the accomplishment in 1974.

=== Selectric-based machines with data storage ===
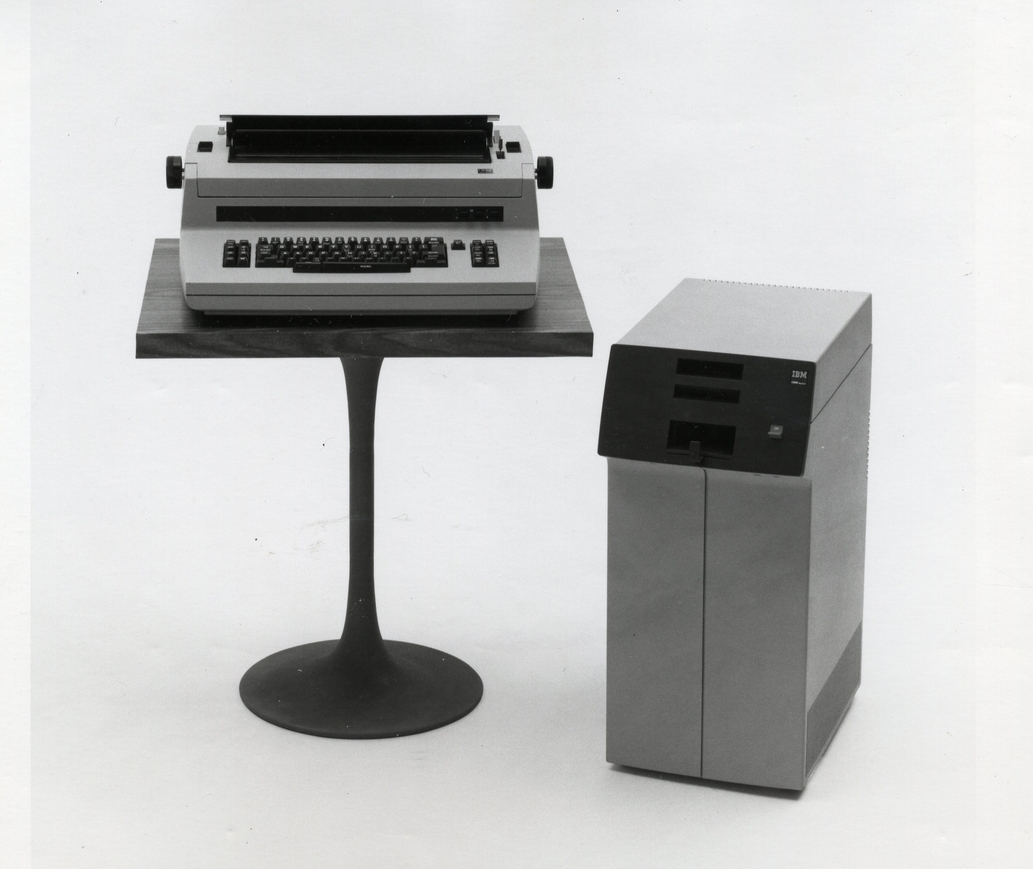
IBM Selectric MC-82 model with MC composer module

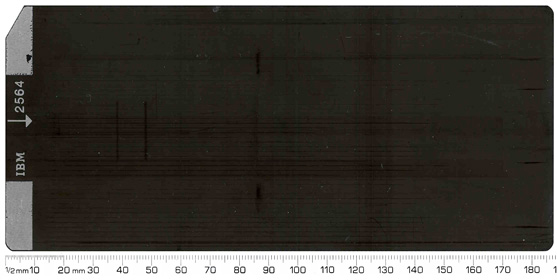
IBM Magnetic Card

In 1964, IBM introduced the "Magnetic Tape Selectric Typewriter" and in 1969, a "Magnetic Card Selectric Typewriter". These were sometimes referred to as the "MT/ST" and "MC/ST", respectively. The MC/ST was also available in a "communicating" version which could emulate an IBM 2741 terminal or run its native Correspondence Code. These featured electronically interfaced typing mechanisms and keyboards and a magnetic storage device (either tape in a cartridge, or a magnetic-coated card the same size as an 80-column punched card) for recording, editing, and replaying typed material at ca. 12–15 characters per second.

These machines were among the first to provide word processing capability in any form. They used the same elements as ordinary office Selectrics.

In 1972, the "Mag Card Executive" was offered. Like IBM's earlier typebar-based "Executive" models, it offered proportional spacing, but was based on multiples of a 1/60" unit size with up to seven units per character, instead of a unit size of 1/32", 1/36", or 1/45", depending on the size of the typestyle, with up to five units per character, as was used on the original "Executive" typewriters. Unlike the various "Selectric Composer" models, there was no provision for setting the machine to vary the letter and word spacing to create justified copy. Some of the fonts originally offered with the Mag Card Executive would later be made available for the Model 50 electronic typewriter, which supported proportional spacing with 96-character elements.

In April 1973, the IBM Mag Card II Typewriter was announced, providing space for up to 8,000 characters in electronic memory.

IBM also sold the IBM 2495, a tape reader that could be connected to 360 series mainframes, and would read the MT/ST tapes. Thus, a document typed on an MT/ST Selectric could also be entered into a mainframe data file.

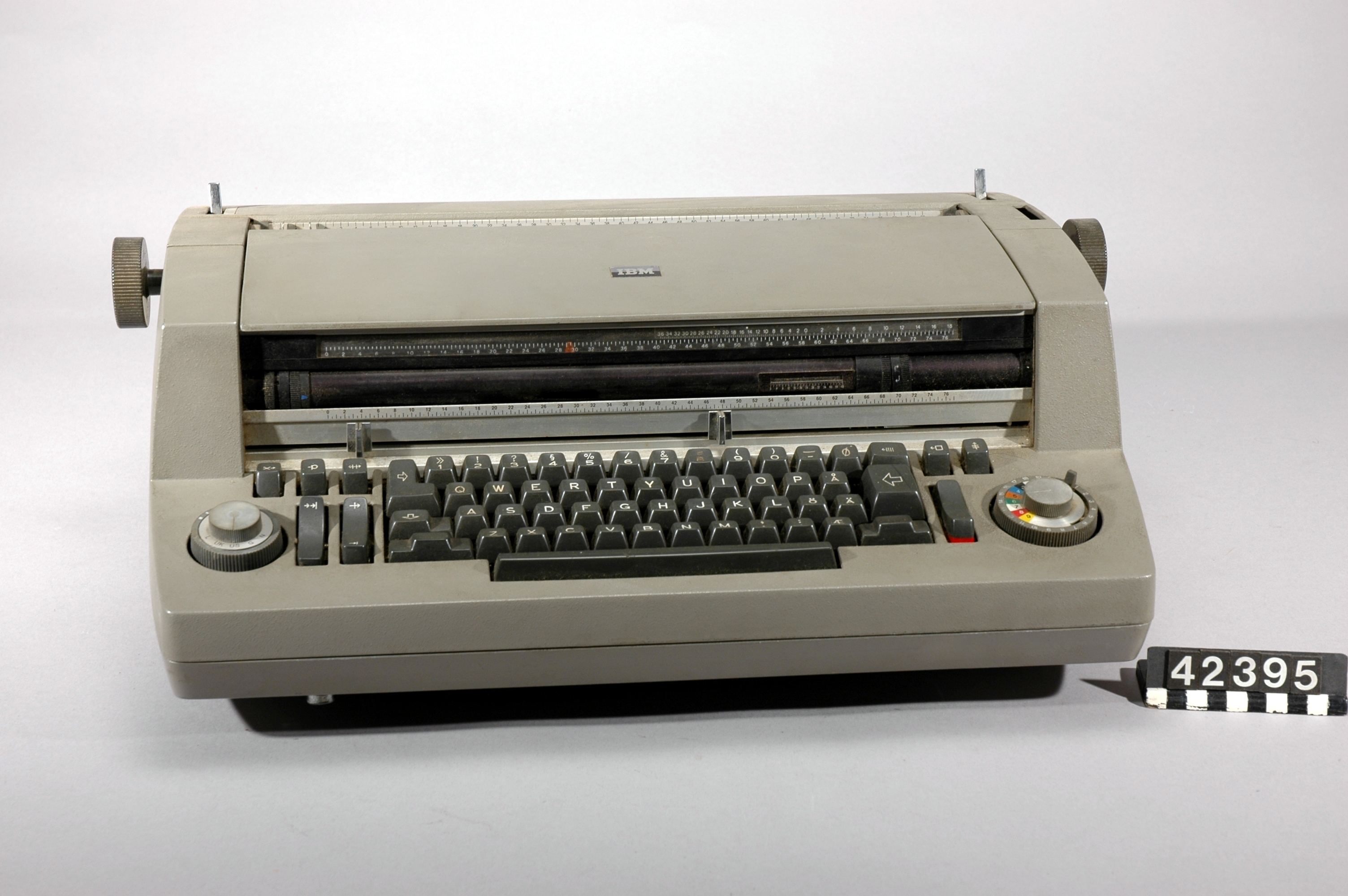
IBM Selectric Composer

=== Selectric Composer ===
In 1966, IBM released the Selectric Composer for use in phototypesetting applications. This highly modified (and much more expensive) Selectric produced camera-ready justified copy using proportional fonts in a variety of font styles ranging from eight to fourteen points. Material prepared on a properly-adjusted machine by a skillful operator and printed onto baryta (barium sulfate-coated) paper "would take an expert to tell ... [that it] was not the product of a Linotype or Monotype machine".

Characters were proportionally spaced, three to nine units wide, the size of a unit being selectable as either 1/72, 1/84 or 1/96 inch to allow for the three sizes of type (a monospaced "typewriter font", in which all characters occupied four units, was available for brief imitations of conventional typed text). Tab stops could be positioned only at intervals of one-sixth of an inch, or one pica. To support backspacing over previously typed characters, the spacing code for the last forty or so characters typed was mechanically stored by small sliding plates in a carrier wheel.

Like the Varityper with which it competed, the original machine required that material be typed twice if the output was to be justified. The first time was to measure the length of the line and count the spaces, recording measurements read from a special dial on the right margin. The second time it was typed, the operator set the measurements into the dial to set justification for each line. The process was tedious and slow, but did provide a way to get camera-ready, proportionally spaced, justified copy from a desk-sized, affordable machine.

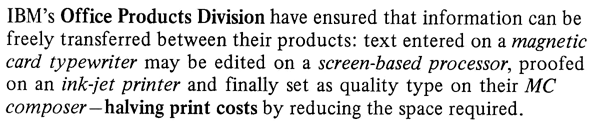
Sample of IBM Magnetic Card Composer output (Press Roman 10pt font family)

The elements for the Selectric Composer would physically fit on a Selectric and vice versa, but were not interchangeable because the characters were arranged and positioned differently around the element. Selectric Composer elements can be distinguished by their colored index arrow (the color indicated which of the three type sizes) and a series of letters and numbers identifying the font, size, and variation; for example, "UN-11-B" for 11-point bold Univers (Adrian Frutiger had adapted the font specifically for the Selectric Composer).

In addition to Univers, a Century, Times Roman–like font and later an "Aldine" font (Bembo) were available, as was a Symbols font. However, the Composer, with its relatively small market, never had anything like the variety of typefaces available as there were for the Selectric (see below). Each font required separate elements for italic and bold versions, and a separate set of roman/italic/bold balls was required for each font size. Not all typefaces were available in bold and italic in every size for every font. Bold italic, condensed, and light fonts were not available. The need to change elements frequently, sometimes multiple times in the same sentence, slowed work down and was a source of owner dissatisfaction (in typical use, Selectric elements were changed infrequently). The small plastic balls themselves were somewhat fragile and not designed to withstand frequent handling. Nevertheless, the Composer allowed much more flexible use of different typefonts, allowing small businesses and organizations to approach the capabilities of professional typesetters, at a reduced cost.

Italic and bold were available for some but not all font "families". Up to three point sizes existed for each style and variety. In contrast with the Selectric, a change of type style usually required purchase of a family of type balls, rather than just a single one. Just as in the days of metal type, no single printing shop had every typeface, it was also rare for a user to possess a complete set, but no user needed to; a publication that could use the somewhat bookish, academic Aldine Roman would probably not have much use for the Classified News or Copperplate Gothic (used most often for formal invitations and business cards). The following font families were available for the Composer:

- Aldine Roman (similar to Bembo)
- Baskerville
- Bodoni
- Century (similar to Century Schoolbook)
- Classified News (similar to News Gothic)
- Copperplate Gothic
- Journal Roman (similar to Janson)
- Orator (a sans-serif for documents to be read aloud, enlarging letters to the maximum possible on the font element)
- Press Roman (similar to Times Roman); includes Press Roman Symbol (Greek, Mathematical, Technical)
- Pyramid (a slab-serif similar to Rockwell)
- Theme (a sans-serif with stroke contrast, similar to Optima)
- Univers
- Ruling Font

In contrast to the Selectric typewriter, only IBM made elements for the standard typefaces usually used with the Composer. GP, which made elements for the Selectric typewriter, did make one Composer element in an Old English typeface.

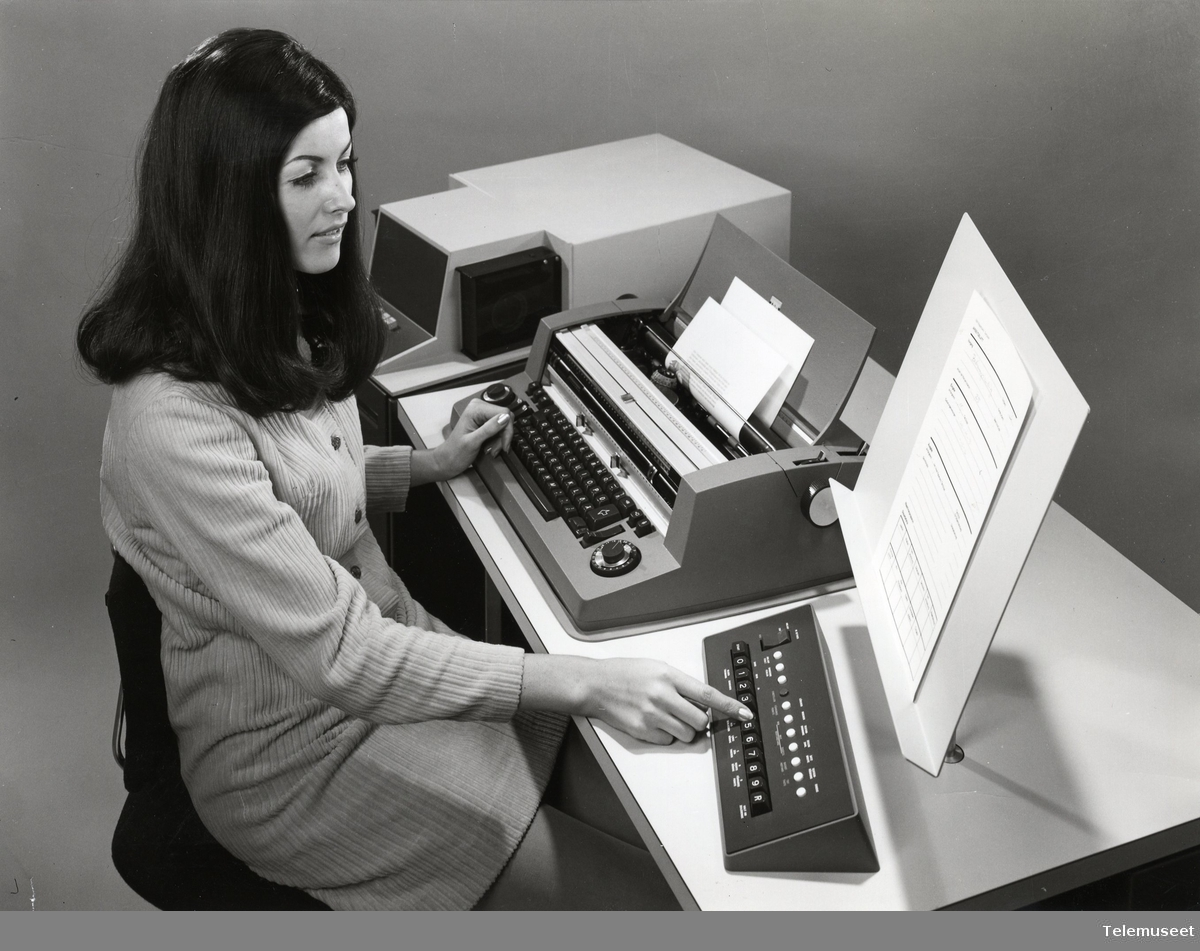
Magnetic Tape/Selectric Composer installation in use

In 1967, a "Magnetic Tape Selectric Composer" appeared, followed in 1978 by a "Magnetic Card Selectric Composer". The "Electronic Composer" (with approximately 5000 characters of internal memory, similar to the later Magnetic Card model but without external storage) was introduced in 1975. All these models used the same Selectric Composer output (printing) mechanism. However, the magnetic or internal storage allowed these improved models to avoid the need to type in justified text twice, or to manually set the mechanism for justification of each line. Furthermore, tapes or cards originally recorded on the much less-expensive and easier-to-operate Selectric typewriter versions, the MT/ST or MC/ST, could be read by the "Composer" equivalents. This allowed much of the time-consuming manual transcription work and proofreading to be performed on less-expensive equipment, while a final high-quality output could be printed on the Composer.

For a number of years after its introduction, the Selectric Composer was considered a highly desirable, powerful desk-sized cold type setting system, affordable by small businesses and organizations. It was usually leased, including a service contract for the skilled labor required to fix and adjust it. The Selectric Composer was accorded respect and affection among small publishers, unrivaled until the appearance of the Apple Macintosh, laser printer, and desktop publishing software. Ultimately, the system proved a transitional product, as it was displaced by cheaper and faster phototypesetting, and then in the 1980s by word processors and general-purpose computers.

==== Electronic Selectric Composer ====
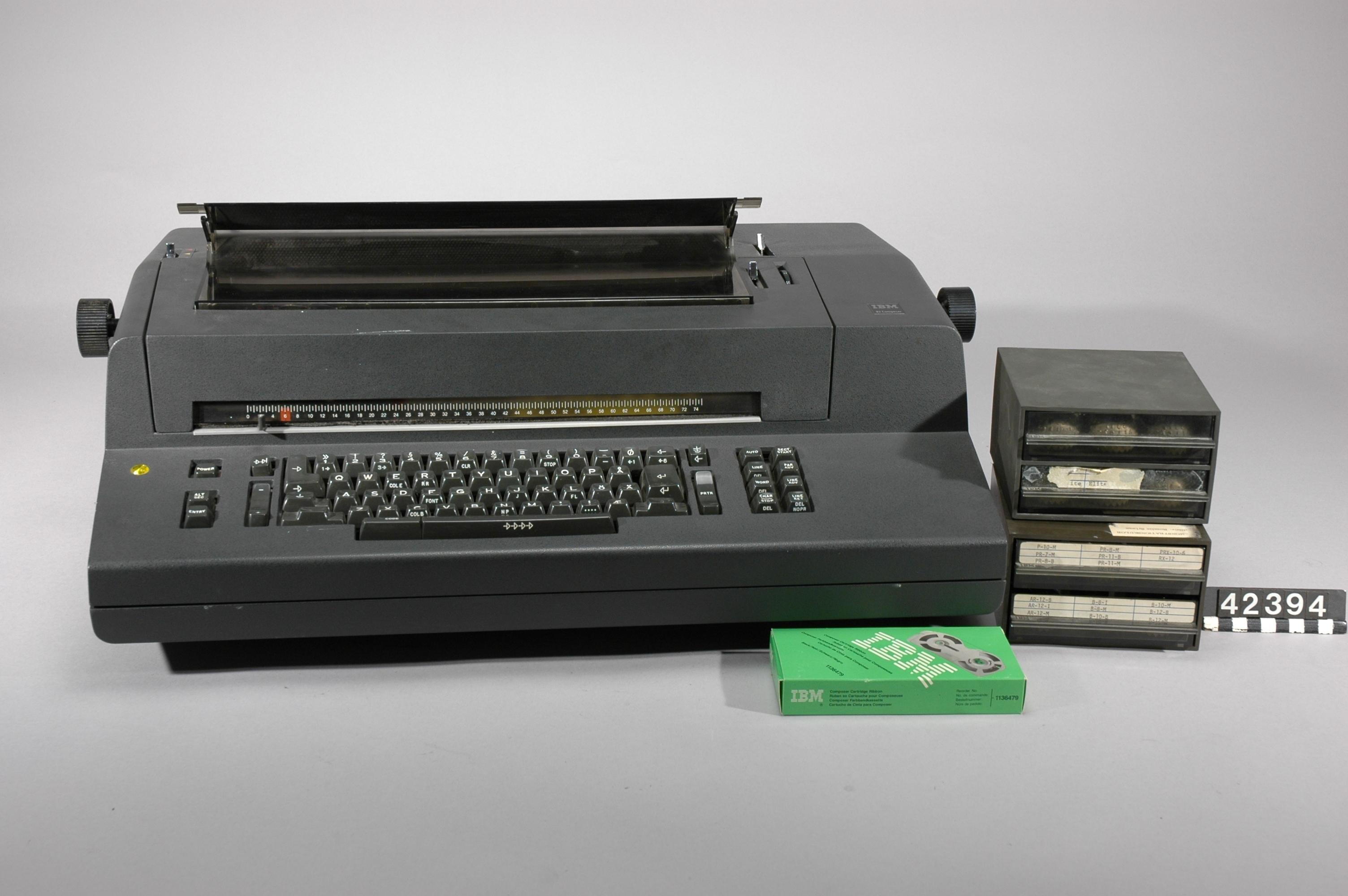
IBM Electronic Selectric Composer with accessories

The Electronic Selectric Composer was released in January 1975 by the office division of IBM; it was an automated, direct impression composition unit with a built-in memory of up to 8,000 characters and automatic justification with one keyboarding. With these features, it became a workhorse for producing camera-ready texts for low-cost books and other publications with modest quality demands. Other features included automatic printout of columns in one playout and reformatting ease with capability of justified, "rag" right, flush left or virtually any configuration specified. It also had over 125 interchangeable printing fonts (type heads) in sizes from 3 to 12 points.

=== Selectric III ===
In 1980, IBM introduced the Selectric III, followed by several other Selectric models, some of them word processors or typesetters instead of typewriters. By then, however, the rest of the industry had caught up, and IBM's new models did not dominate the market the way the first Selectric had. This was to be expected; during the late 1970s, the Selectric typewriter's dominance was threatened by both 35–45 character per second proportional-spacing electronic typewriters with inbuilt memory, like the 800 from Xerox based on Diablo's "daisywheels" and OEMs of Qume which had similar printwheel technology, and CRT-based systems from AES, Lexitron, Vydek, Wang and Xerox. In addition, IBM had already (c. 1977) introduced the CRT-based Office System/6 and 5520, both of which used the new 6640 inkjet printer capable of 96 characters per second with two paper trays and sophisticated envelope handling, and was about to introduce Qume-based printers for the existing System/6 range and the new Displaywriter (launched in June 1980 and described by IBM as "not your father's Selectric"). Nevertheless, IBM had a large installed base of Selectric typewriters, and it made sense to introduce updated models to retain customer loyalty.

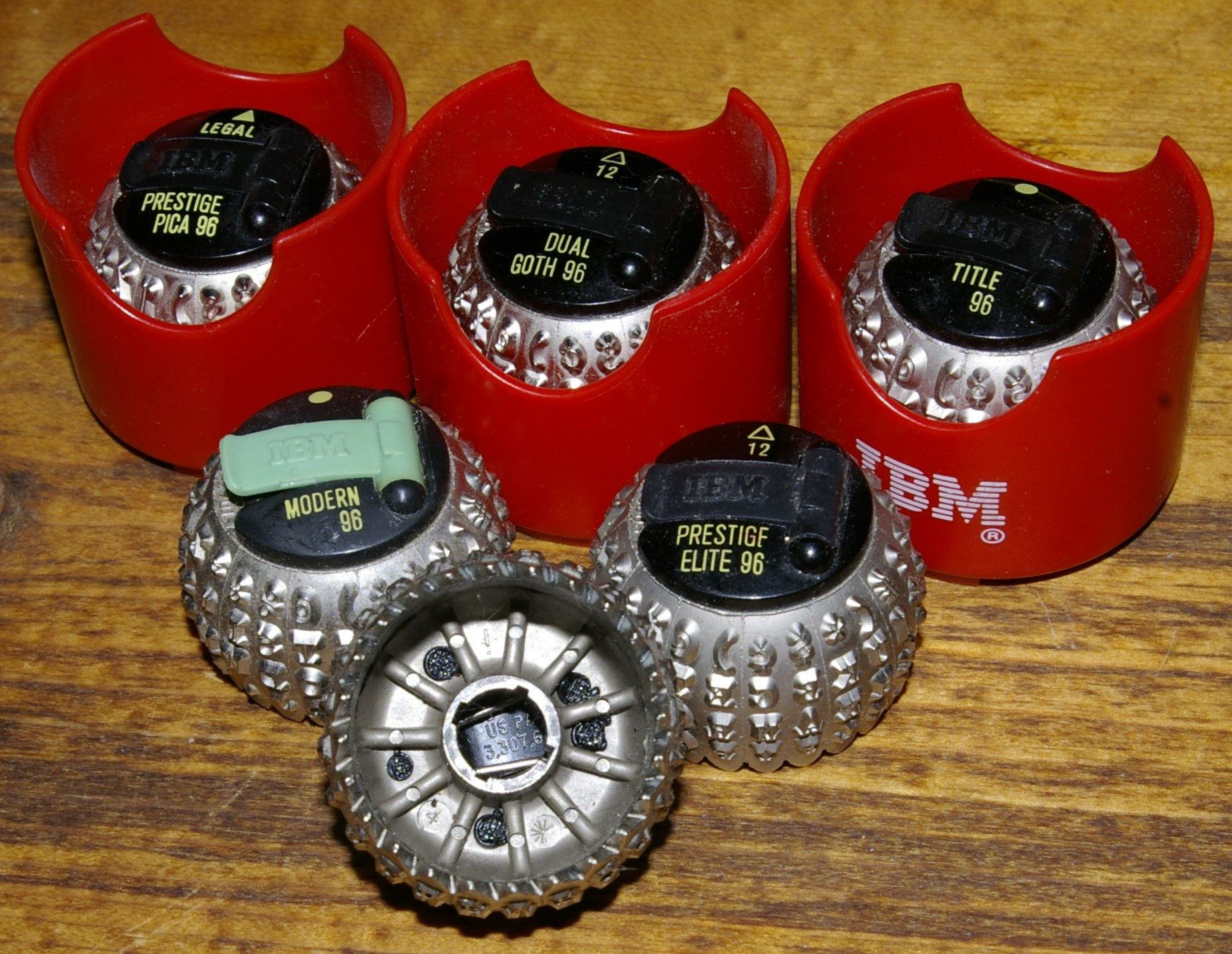

The Selectric III featured a 96-character element in contrast to the previous 88-character element. IBM's series of "Electronic Typewriters" used this same 96-character element. The 96-character elements can be identified by yellow printing on the top plastic surface and the legend "96", which always appears along with the font name and pitch. The 96- and 88-character elements are mechanically incompatible with each other (they will not fit on each other's machines), and 96-character elements were not available in as many fonts as the older 88-character types.

Most Selectric IIIs and Electronic Typewriters had keys only for 92 printable characters; the 96-character keyboard was an optional feature. Fitting the additional keys onto the keyboard required shrinking the Return and Backspace keys. This was annoying to many typists, so it was not the default configuration. The keytops on Selectric III and Electronic Typewriters were larger and more square than those on earlier Selectrics.

Some versions of the Electronic Typewriter, the original Model 50, and the later Model 65 and 85 could use 96-character elements with proportionally-spaced typestyles in addition to 10-pitch and 12-pitch typestyles. This proportional spacing was based on a unit of 1/60 of an inch, since 10-pitch characters took six such units, and 12-pitch characters took five such units (many daisywheel typewriters, offering similar capabilities, also had daisywheel elements for 15-pitch typing, using four units per character). The proportional typestyles offered for these typewriters had previously been offered, along with some others, on 88-character elements for a little-known variant of the MC/ST called the Mag Card Executive.

=== IBM Personal Typewriter ===
Shortly after the introduction of the Selectric III, IBM introduced the IBM Personal Typewriter, a hybrid model that used the widely available 88-character "golf ball" type elements and correction tape of the Selectric II, but used the newer Selectric III's ribbon cartridges. Limited to a single fixed pitch (only 12 CPI, though either pica or elite type elements could be used), the typewriter was significantly less expensive than either the Selectric II or Selectric III, and targeted the home and consumer markets.

=== Eavesdropping ===
There is at least one known case of the Selectric exploited as a covert listening device of the type known as a "keyboard logger". In 1984, bugs were discovered in at least 16 Selectric typewriters in the U.S. Embassy in Moscow and the U.S. Consulate in Leningrad. The highly sophisticated devices were planted by the Soviets between 1976 and 1984, and were hidden inside a metal support bar. Information was intercepted by detecting the movements of metal bars inside the typewriter (the "latch interposers") by means of magnetometers. The data were then compressed and transmitted in bursts. The bugs were installed in Selectric II and III models.

=== Successor and discontinuation ===
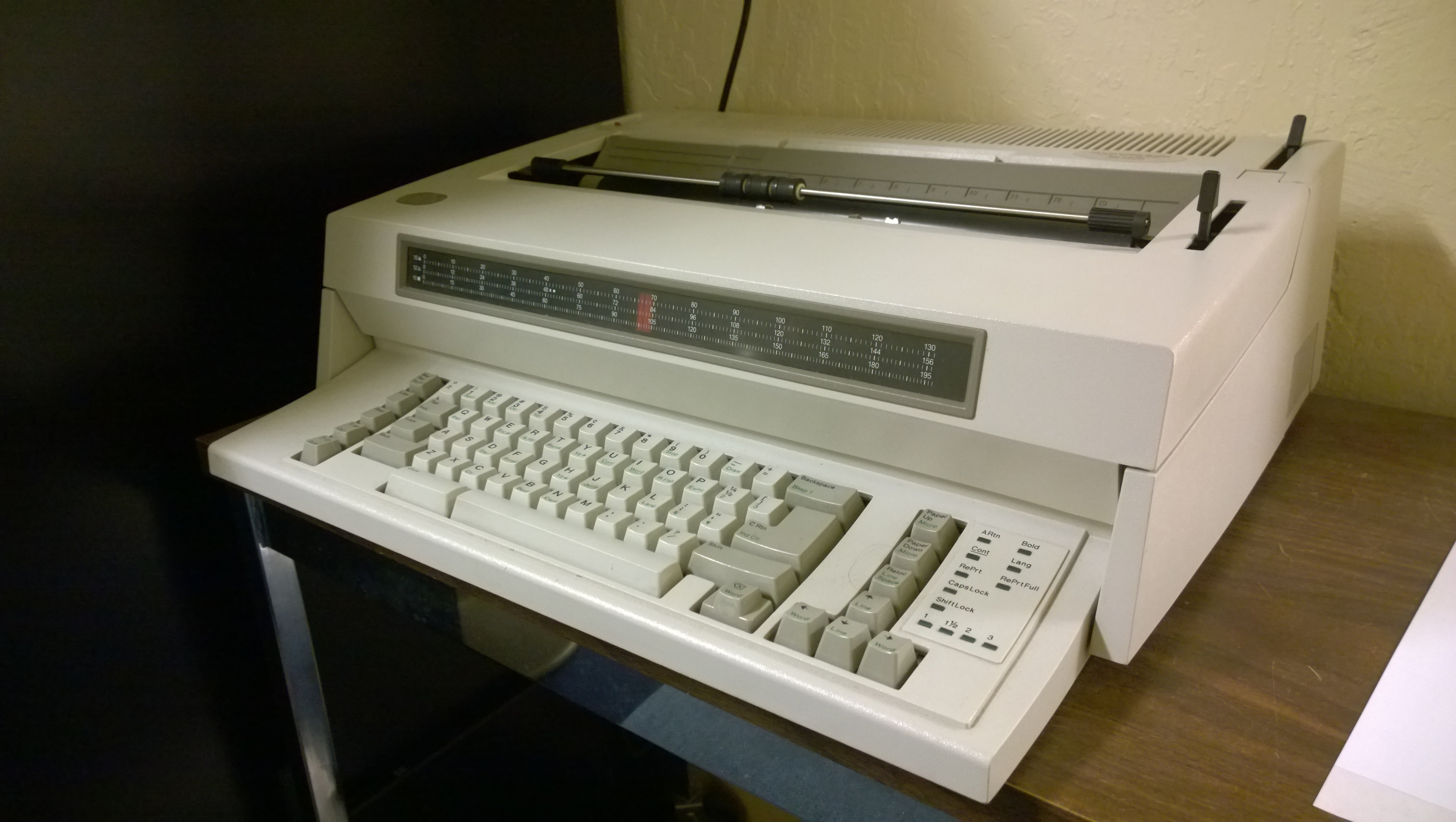
IBM Wheelwriter 15, Series II

IBM introduced the IBM Wheelwriter in 1984 as a successor to the Selectric. The Wheelwriter featured a replaceable daisy wheel cartridge, had electronic memory, and offered many word processing features.

The Selectric line was discontinued by IBM on June 30, 1987.

== Keyboard layout ==
American typewriter keyboard layout

Selectric III keyboard layout

The Selectric's keyboard layout put the underscore, hyphen, and single and double quote characters as pairs on their own keys – an arrangement which had already been used on many earlier electric typewriters, including IBM's own Model A onwards. The traditional layout of mechanical typewriters had offered these characters as shifts from digit keys. (Note: This design dated back to the Remington No. 2 (1878), the first typewriter with a shift key and extensive symbols.) Electric typewriter designers had made this change because smaller characters need to hit the paper with less force than most, and pairing these characters in this way avoided the need to adjust the force based on shift state.

About a decade later, this character pairing was formalized in the American Standards Association X4.14-1971 standard as typewriter pairing (colloquially a typewriter-paired keyboard), along with bit-paired keyboards. Typewriter pairing became the only supported arrangement in the successor X4.23-1982 standard.

The Selectric also added a dedicated key for 1 / !. The typist no longer had to use a lowercase L, nor overstrike the single quote and period characters, as had been the practice on most earlier typewriters.

These changes were later copied by the IBM Model D electric typewriter (1967), and later still by DEC's VT52 terminal (1975) and the original IBM PC (1981). Typewriter pairing was seen on many other computer keyboards, particularly the influential Model M (1985).

The new layout was not universal, however, as many layouts kept the bit-paired arrangement internationally. This is easily visible in ⇧ Shift+2 yielding ", as on the standard UK layout. The bit-paired symbols are also retained in the Japanese keyboard layout.

== Selectric mechanism ==
Demonstration of the Selectric mechanism

Mechanically, the Selectric borrowed some design elements from a toy typewriter produced earlier by Marx Toys, the design of which IBM bought the rights to. The element and carriage mechanism was similar to the design of the Teletype Model 26 and later, which used a rotating cylinder that moved along a fixed platen.

The mechanism that positions the typing element ("ball") takes a binary input, and converts this to character offsets using two mechanical digital-to-analog converters, which are "whiffletree" linkages of the type used for adding and subtracting in linkage-type mechanical analog computers (the nomenclature used by IBM Office Product Customer Engineers and in IBM maintenance publications for the machine's "whiffletrees" is "Rotate and Tilt Differentials"). Every character position on the element has a two-part binary code: one for tilt and one for rotate.

The motor at the back of the machine drives a belt connected to a two-part shaft located roughly halfway through the machine. The cycle shaft on the left side powers the tilt and rotate mechanism. The operational shaft on the right side powers functions such as spacing, backspacing, and case shifting, as well as serving as a governor, limiting the left-to-right speed with which the carrier moves. A series of spring clutches power the cams which provide the motion needed to perform functions such as backspacing.

When the typist presses a key, a pawl on the key lever depresses a matching metal bar (interposer) for that key. The interposer, which is oriented front to back in the machine, has one or more short projections (lugs) protruding from its bottom edge. Each interposer has a unique combination of lugs, corresponding to the binary code for the desired character. Each interposer also has a tab that slots in between loose steel balls in a race, the size of balls and race selected precisely to leave a total gap barely larger than the width of the interposer tab, such that only one interposer tab can fit in the free space and thus only one letter can be selected at a time.

When the interposer is depressed, it engages a metal bar (cycle clutch latch link) that connects the clutch on the cycle shaft for one cycle, providing power to the filter shaft, whose lobes thrust the interposer towards the front (operator end) of the machine. When the interposer moves, each of its lugs engages one of a set of bars (selector bails) that run from left to right across the keyboard mechanism. In a machine with a North American keyboard, there are five "negative logic" selector bails (two for tilt and three for rotation), and one "positive logic" bail (called "minus five") for accessing characters in the opposite direction of rotation.

Each negative logic selector bail that is displaced by the interposer in turn pulls a latch interposer and link, which causes a selector latch near the cycle shaft to be pulled away from the latch bail. The latches pulled away in this manner are disengaged for the rest of the cycle, while the remaining latches take part in character selection, hence the term "negative logic". The minus five selector bail pulls an interposer and link, which causes a latch to disengage from a cam, allowing it to move an additional input into the whiffletree that subtracts five units of rotation from any negative logic inputs. An additional "low velocity" selector latch is also engaged by certain keys (e.g. period and underscore) which require a reduced striking force so as not to cut the paper; this selector latch engages the low velocity control cam follower, which pulls the low velocity cable connected to the cam in the carrier, causing the low velocity lobe to be used instead of the usual high velocity lobe. Additionally, punctuation marks are deliberately placed about the ball so the maximum amount of energy is used to position the element prior to striking, further reducing the impact.

The selector latches that remain engaged with the latch bail cause cams on the drive shaft (which is rotating) to move the ends of the links in the whiffletree linkage, which sums (adds together) the amounts ("weights") of movement corresponding to the selected bits. The sum of the weighted inputs is the required movement of the typing element. There are two sets of similar mechanisms: one for tilt and one for rotate. The typing element has four rows of 22 characters. By tilting and rotating the element to the location of a character, the element can be thrust against the ribbon and platen, leaving an imprint of the chosen character.

Tilt and rotate movements are transferred to the carrier (the mechanism that supports the element), which moves across the page, by two taut metal tapes, one for tilt and one for rotate. The tilt and rotate tapes are both anchored to the right side of the carrier. They both wrap around separate pulleys at the right side of the frame; the tilt pulley is fixed, while the rotate pulley is attached to the shift arm, actuated by the Shift and Caps Lock keys. The tapes extend across the machine behind the carrier, and then wrap around two separate pulleys at the left side of the frame. The tilt tape is then anchored to a small, quarter-circle pulley which, through a link, tips the tilt ring (the device to which the element is connected) to one of four possible locations. The rotate tape is wrapped around a spring-loaded pulley located in the middle of the carrier. The rotate pulley under the tilt ring is connected through a universal joint (called a "dog bone", which it resembles) to the center of the tilt ring. The element is spring-latched onto that central post. The element rotates counter-clockwise when the rotate tape is tightened. The spiral "clock" spring underneath the rotate pulley rotates the element in the clockwise direction. As the carrier moves across the page (such as when it returns), the tapes travel over their pulleys, but the spring-loaded pulleys on the ball carrier do not pivot or rotate.

To position the ball, both of the pulleys on the left side of the frame are moved by their whiffletree linkages, actuated by the selected drive shaft cams. When the rotate pulley is moved to the right or left, the rotate tape spins the element to the appropriate location. When the tilt pulley is moved, it tips the tilt ring to the appropriate location. When it moves, the tape rotates the spring-loaded pulley on the ball carrier independent of the carrier's location on the page.

Case is shifted from lowercase to uppercase (and associated shifted punctuation symbols) by rotating the element by exactly half a turn. This is accomplished by moving the right-hand rotate pulley via the shift arm, using a cam mounted on the end of the operation shaft; the additional cable tension adds 180° to any rotation from the whiffletree.

After a character is struck onto the paper, the mechanism is reset, including replacing all latches on their bails and moving the interposer back into position. If the key that was pressed is still down at this time, the interposer rotates the keylever pawl out of the way to prevent key repeat until the key is released and depressed again, starting the next cycle.

The complex Selectric system was highly dependent upon periodic lubrication and adjustment, and much of IBM's revenue stream came from the sale of service contracts on the machines. Repair was fairly expensive, requiring specialized skills and parts, so maintenance contracts were an easy sell. Infrequently-used Selectric mechanisms must be operated ("exercised") and properly lubricated to keep them from binding up.

Both Selectric and the later Selectric II were available in standard-, medium-, and wide-carriage models and in various colors, including red and blue, as well as traditional neutral colors.

== Inked and correcting ribbons ==
In addition to the "typeball" technology, Selectrics were associated with several innovations in ink ribbon design.

The original Selectric had to be ordered to use either cloth reusable ribbon or one-time carbon film ribbon; the same machine could not use both. This was also true of the original, non-correcting Selectric II. IBM had used a similar carbon film ribbon on their earlier Executive series of typewriters. As with these older machines, the carbon film ribbon presented a security issue in some environments: it was possible to read the text that had been typed from the ribbon, seen as light characters against the darker ribbon background.

The Correcting Selectric II used a new ribbon cartridge mechanism. The cartridge contained both supply and take-up spools, permitting both easy ribbon changes and the use of several types of ribbon on one machine. The ribbons were wider than had been used previously, giving more typed characters per inch of ribbon. Successive characters were staggered vertically on the ribbon, which incremented less than a full character position each time. Different types of ribbons had different-depth holes in the bottom of the cartridge, which set the mechanism to advance the ribbon by the amount appropriate for the type of ribbon.

Three types of ribbons were initially available for the Correcting Selectric II: reusable cloth ribbon (essentially the same as had been used on typewriters for decades); carbon film ribbon, like that used on earlier Selectrics; and the new Correctable (carbon) Film ribbon. The latter used a carbon pigment similar to that on the regular carbon film ribbon, but its binder did not permanently adhere to the paper. This permitted the use of the adhesive Lift-Off correction tape in the new machine, producing a very "clean" correction. The other types of ribbons required Cover-Up tape, which deposited a white ink on top of the characters being corrected. This complicated corrections on paper colors other than white.

Shortly after the machine was introduced, a "Tech-3" ribbon appeared. It essentially replaced the cloth ribbon, as it offered typing quality close to the film ribbon, but at a use cost comparable to the reusable cloth. Like the cloth ribbon, Tech-3 ribbons incremented only a fraction of the character width after being struck. Unlike the cloth ribbon, the Tech-3 ribbon provided high-quality impressions for several characters from each spot on the one-time-use ribbon. Because characters overstrike each other on a Tech-3 ribbon several times, it could not be easily read to discover what had been typed. The Tech-3 ribbon offered equivalent document security to the carbon film ribbon, as its impressions were permanent as soon as they had been struck. The Tech-3 ribbon was used with the same cover-up tape that worked with the other non-correctable ribbons.

The thumb wheel on the ribbon cartridge and the correction tape spools were color-coded so they could be easily identified and matched with the appropriate correction tapes: Yellow for the correctable film ribbon and Lift-Off tape; gray, pink, and blue for cloth, carbon film, and Tech-3, respectively. Later another type of correctable film ribbon and lift-off tape appeared, both color-coded orange. The yellow meant the ribbon was a higher quality and would produce a better-quality type image. Orange was a lower-cost ribbon for everyday typing. The yellow and orange coded lift-off tapes would work with either ribbon type.

The slightly adhesive Lift-Off tape would sometimes damage more delicate paper surfaces. A less "sticky" version of these tapes was eventually offered, but some believed it did not remove the ink as well. Some typists found that a piece of adhesive tape such as Scotch Tape could be used in place of lift-off tape.

Colored film ribbons (red, blue, green and brown) were also available. The ribbon cartridge mechanism did not allow for two-color ribbons, such as black and red, which had been common on earlier typewriters.

== Type elements and fonts ==
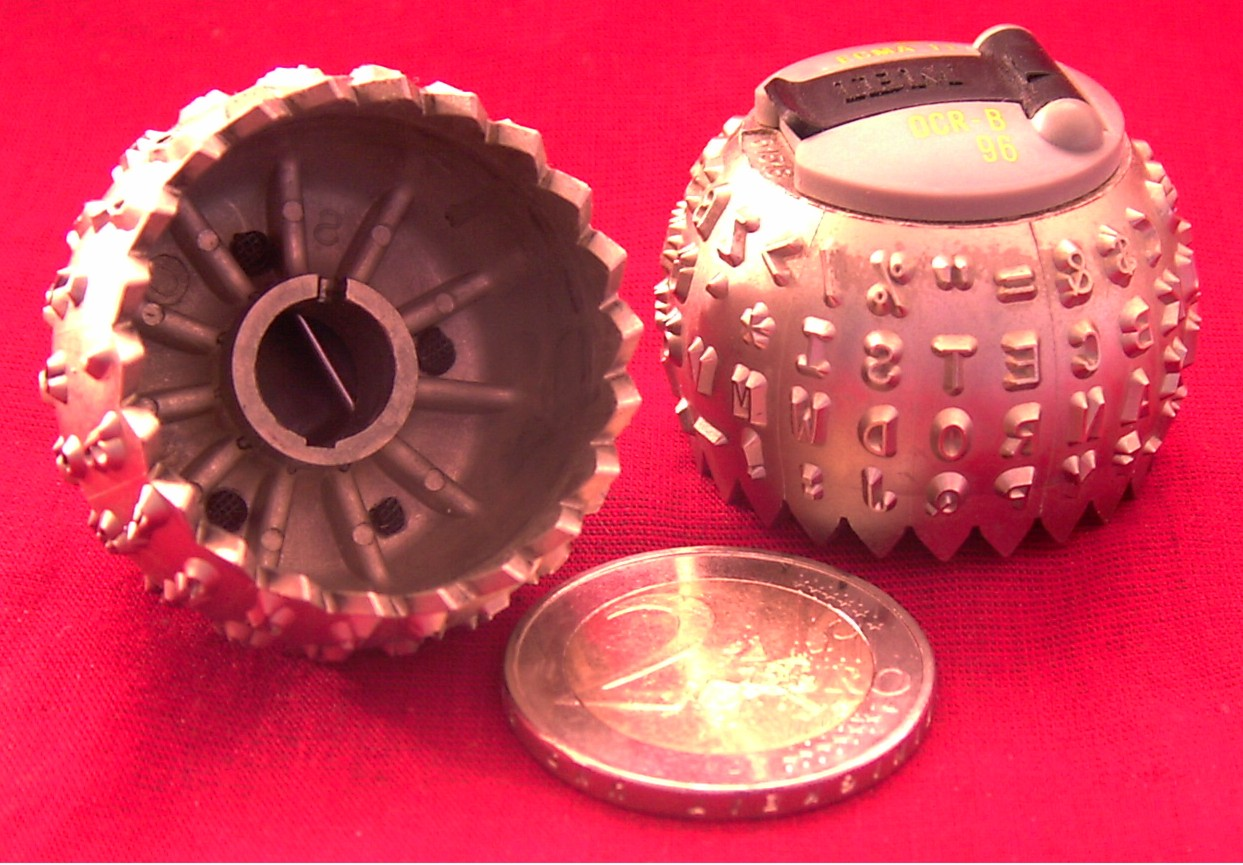
88-character IBM typing elements (one OCR) with clip and €2 coin for scale

The Selectric I, Selectric II, and all the "Magnetic Card" and "Magnetic Tape" variations (except for the Composers) use the same typing elements. These are available in many fonts, including symbols for science and mathematics, OCR faces for scanning by computers, cursive script, "Old English" (fraktur), and more than a dozen ordinary alphabets. Israeli typographer Henri Friedlaender designed the Hebrew fonts Hadar, Shalom & Aviv for the Selectric. The Selectric III and "Electronic Typewriters" used a new 96-character element.

IBM also produced computer terminals based on the Selectric mechanism, some of which (all models of the IBM 1050 series, and IBM 2741 models using "PTTC/BCD" code) used a different encoding. Though the elements were physically interchangeable, the characters were differently arranged, so standard Selectric elements could not be used in them and their elements could not be used in standard Selectrics. On the other hand, IBM 2741s using "correspondence coding" used standard office Selectric elements. The IBM 1130 computer used a Selectric mechanism as the console printer.

There were two visibly different styles of mechanical design for the elements. The original models had a metal spring clip with two wire wings that were squeezed together to release the element from the typewriter. Later models had a plastic lever molded around a metal axle which pried apart the now-internal spring clip. This had a tendency to break where the lever joined the axle. The Selectric element was later redesigned to have a more durable all-plastic lever.

The font size was measured not in points but in pitch; that is, the number of letters per one inch of the typed line. As a result, 12-pitch fonts (12 letters per inch) were actually smaller than 10-pitch fonts (10 letters per inch), and roughly corresponded to the 10pt and 12pt traditional typographic font sizes.

Some of the interchangeable typing elements available for the Selectric models included:

=== Small (12-pitch) fonts ===
- Elite 72
- Auto Elite
- Large Elite (12)
- Prestige Elite 72
- Prestige Elite 96*
- Adjutant
- Artisan
- Contempo
- Courier (12)
- Courier Italic
- Courier Italic 96*
- Forms
- Letter Gothic
- Letter Gothic 96*
- Light Italic
- Olde English (10/12)*
- Olde World
- Oriental
- Presidential Elite
- Report 96 (12)*
- Scribe
- Scribe 96*
- Script
- Symbol

=== Large (10-pitch) fonts ===
- Advocate
- Boldface
- Bold Courier (10)
- Bookface Academic 72
- Bookface Academic 96*
- Business Script
- Courier (10)
- Courier 96 (10)
- Delegate
- Delegate 96*
- Manifold 72
- Olde English (10/12)*
- OCR
- Orator (a large sans-serif font, like Univers, for documents to be read aloud)
- Orator 96*
- Orator Presenter 96*
- Pica 72
- Pica 96*
- Presidential Pica
- Prestige Pica 72
- Report 96 (10)*
- Sunshine Orator
- Symbol 96
- Title
- Title*

Starred fonts were 96-character elements made for the Selectric III.

Some specialized fonts were available in international markets, where local characters were needed (e.g. ÅÄÖÜØÆÑÇ etc.)

Many of the fonts listed here came in several sub-varieties. For example, in the early years of the Selectric, typists were used to using the lower-case letter "L" for the numeral "1", as many previous typewriters lacked a dedicated numeral "1" key. The Selectric had a dedicated key for "1"/"!", but this was also marked "["/"]", as many of the early elements had square brackets in these positions. Using such an element required the typist to continue the old convention. Later elements tended to have the dedicated numeral "1" and exclamation point characters instead. Some moved the square brackets to the positions formerly occupied by the 1/4 and 1/2 fractions, while others lost them completely. Some put a degree symbol in place of the exclamation point. IBM would furthermore customize any element for a fee, so literally endless variations were possible. Such customized elements were identified by a gray plastic flip-up clip instead of a black one.

Many specialized elements were not listed in IBM's regular brochure, but were available from IBM, provided that the right part number was known. For example, the element for the APL programming language was available. This element was really intended for use with the IBM 2741 printing terminal. The IBM 1130 also used this element when running APL\1130.

== Features and uses ==
The ability to change fonts, combined with the neat regular appearance of the typed page, was revolutionary, and marked the beginning of desktop publishing. Later models with dual pitch (10/12) and built-in correcting tape carried the trend even further. Any typist could produce a polished manuscript.

The possibility to intersperse text in Latin letters with Greek letters and mathematical symbols made the machine especially useful for scientists writing manuscripts that included mathematical formulas. Proper mathematical typesetting was very laborious before the advent of TeX, and done only for much-sold textbooks and very prestigious scientific journals. Special elements also were released for the Athabaskan languages, allowing Navajo and Apache bilingual programs in education to be typed for the first time.

The machine had a feature called "Stroke Storage" that prevented two keys from being depressed simultaneously. When a key was depressed, an interposer beneath the keylever was pushed down into a slotted tube full of small metal balls (called the "compensator tube") and spring latched. These balls were adjusted to have enough horizontal space for only one interposer to enter at a time (mechanisms much like this were used in keyboards for teleprinters before World War II). If a typist pressed two keys simultaneously, both interposers were blocked from entering the tube. Pressing two keys several milliseconds apart allows the first interposer to enter the tube, tripping a clutch which rotated a fluted shaft driving the interposer horizontally and out of the tube. The powered horizontal motion of the interposer selected the appropriate rotate and tilt of the printhead for character selection, but also made way for the second interposer to enter the tube some milliseconds later, well before the first character had been printed. While a full print cycle was 65 milliseconds, this filtering and storage feature allowed the typist to depress keys in a more random fashion and still print the characters in the sequence entered.

The space bar, dash/underscore, index, backspace and line feed repeated when continually held down. This feature was referred to as "Typamatic".

=== Use as a computer terminal ===
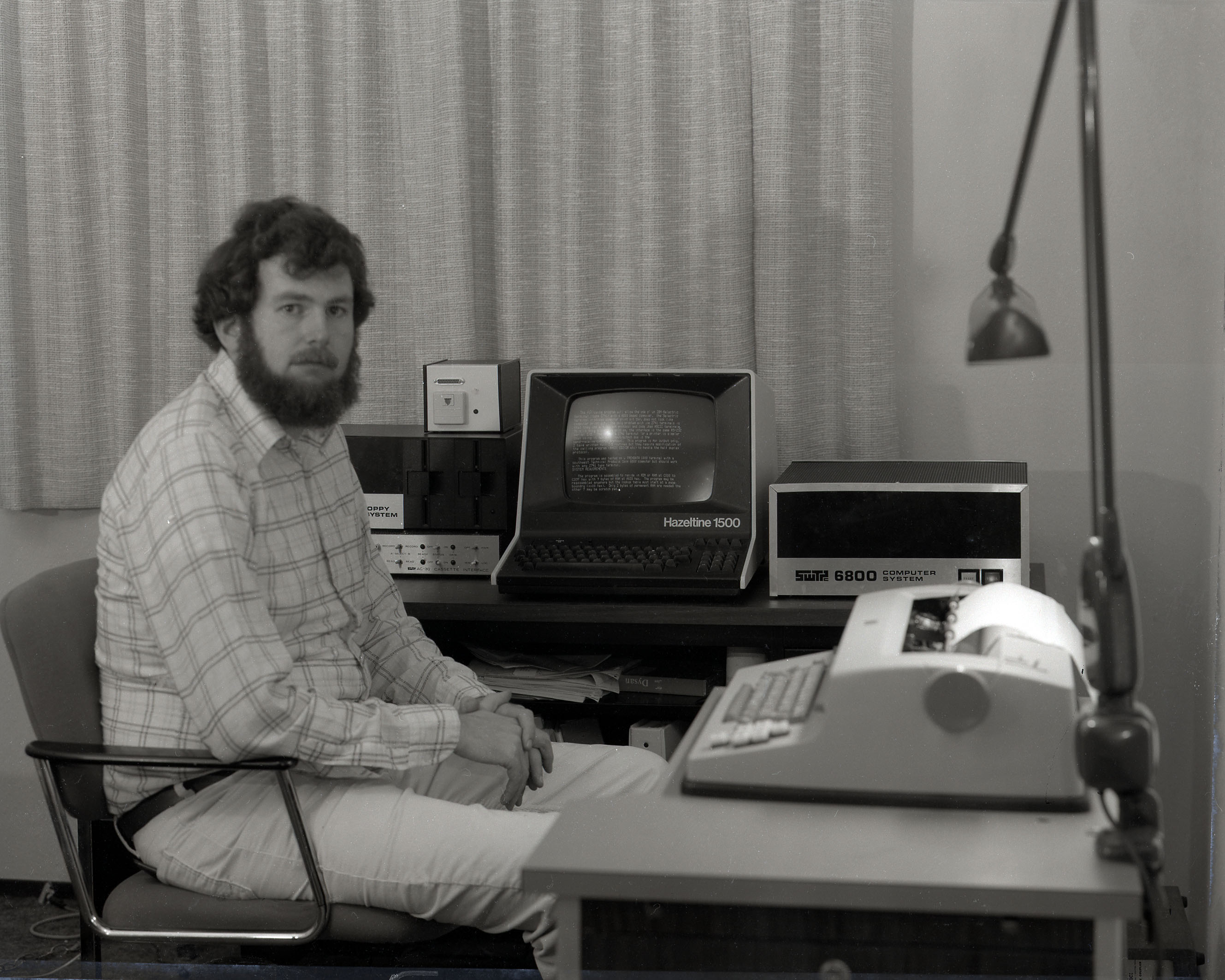
Home computer hobbyist with a Selectric printing terminal (1978)

Due to their speed (14.8 characters per second), immunity to clashing typebars, trouble-free paper path, high quality printed output, and reliability, Selectric-based mechanisms were also widely used as terminals for computers, replacing both Teletypes and older typebar-based output devices. One popular example was the IBM 2741 terminal. Among other applications, the 2741 (with a special typing element) figured prominently in the early years of the APL programming language.

Despite appearances, these machines were not simply Selectric typewriters with an RS-232 connector added. As with other electric typewriters and electric adding machines of the era, Selectrics are electromechanical, not electronic, devices: the only electrical components are the cord, an on-off switch, and the motor. The keys are not electrical pushbuttons such as those found on a computer keyboard. Pressing a key does not produce an electrical signal as output, but rather engages a series of clutches which couple the motor power to the mechanism to turn and tilt the element. A Selectric would work equally well if hand-cranked (or foot-powered, like treadle powered sewing machines) at sufficient speed.

The original Selectric mechanism was designed and manufactured by the office equipment division of IBM, and was not engineered for use as a computer terminal. Adapting this mechanism to the needs of computer input/output was not simple. Microswitches were added to the keyboard, solenoids were added to allow the computer to trigger the typing mechanism, and interface electronics were also needed. Several mechanical components, particularly the motor and the main clutch, had to be upgraded from the typewriter versions to reliably support continuous operation. Additional microswitches had to be added to sense the state of various parts of the mechanism, such as case (upper vs. lower).

Even after adding all those solenoids and switches, getting a Selectric to talk to a computer was a complicated endeavor. The Selectric mechanism had many peculiar requirements. If commanded to shift to upper-case when it was already in upper-case, the mechanism locked up and never signaled "done"; the same applied to shifting the ribbon (black/red) or initiating a carriage-return. These commands could be issued only at particular times, with the Selectric in a particular state, and then not again until the terminal signaled the operation was complete.

In addition, the Selectric mechanism natively used the Selectric correspondence code, a unique 7-bit code based on the "tilt/rotate" commands to the golf ball. This, coupled with the bit-parallel interface and peculiar timing requirements, meant the Selectric could not be directly hooked up to a modem. Indeed, it needed a relatively large amount of logic to reconcile the two devices, and the interface logic often outweighed the printing mechanism in the early years.

Nevertheless, home-brew and commercial Selectric conversions from Wang and Tycom converted the Selectric office typewriter into a computer printer. Such Selectric conversions produce hard-copy computer output that was once described as better than any other hard-copy computer output system, regardless of cost.

The optimum data rate used to drive the Selectric mechanism turned out to be equivalent to 134.5 baud, a highly unusual data rate before the appearance of the mechanism. Driving the Selectric mechanism at the more-standard rate of 110 baud appeared to work well, although at a slightly slower speed. However, driving the mechanism at a non-optimal rate would soon result in its failure, by forcing an internal start-stop clutch to actuate for each character typed, thus wearing it out very rapidly. Continuous typing at the proper 134.5 baud rate would engage the clutch only at the beginning and end of a long sequence of characters, as designed.

The popularity of the Selectric mechanism caused other computer manufacturers, such as Digital Equipment Corporation, to support the 134.5 baud data rate on their serial computer interfaces, enabling connection of IBM 2741 terminals. The 2741 was available with two different seven-bit codes: Correspondence and PTT/BCD. Code choice affected the font elements that could be used. The host computer had to translate the 2741 code into the host's internal code (usually ASCII or EBCDIC). Dedicated hardware was also built to drive Selectric printers at 134.5 baud.

Particularly vexing was the Selectric's lack of a full ASCII character set. Bob Bemer wrote that, while working for IBM, he lobbied unsuccessfully to expand the typing element to 64 characters from 44. The Selectric actually provided 44 characters per case, but the point remains that with 88 printable characters, it could not quite produce the full, printable ASCII character set.

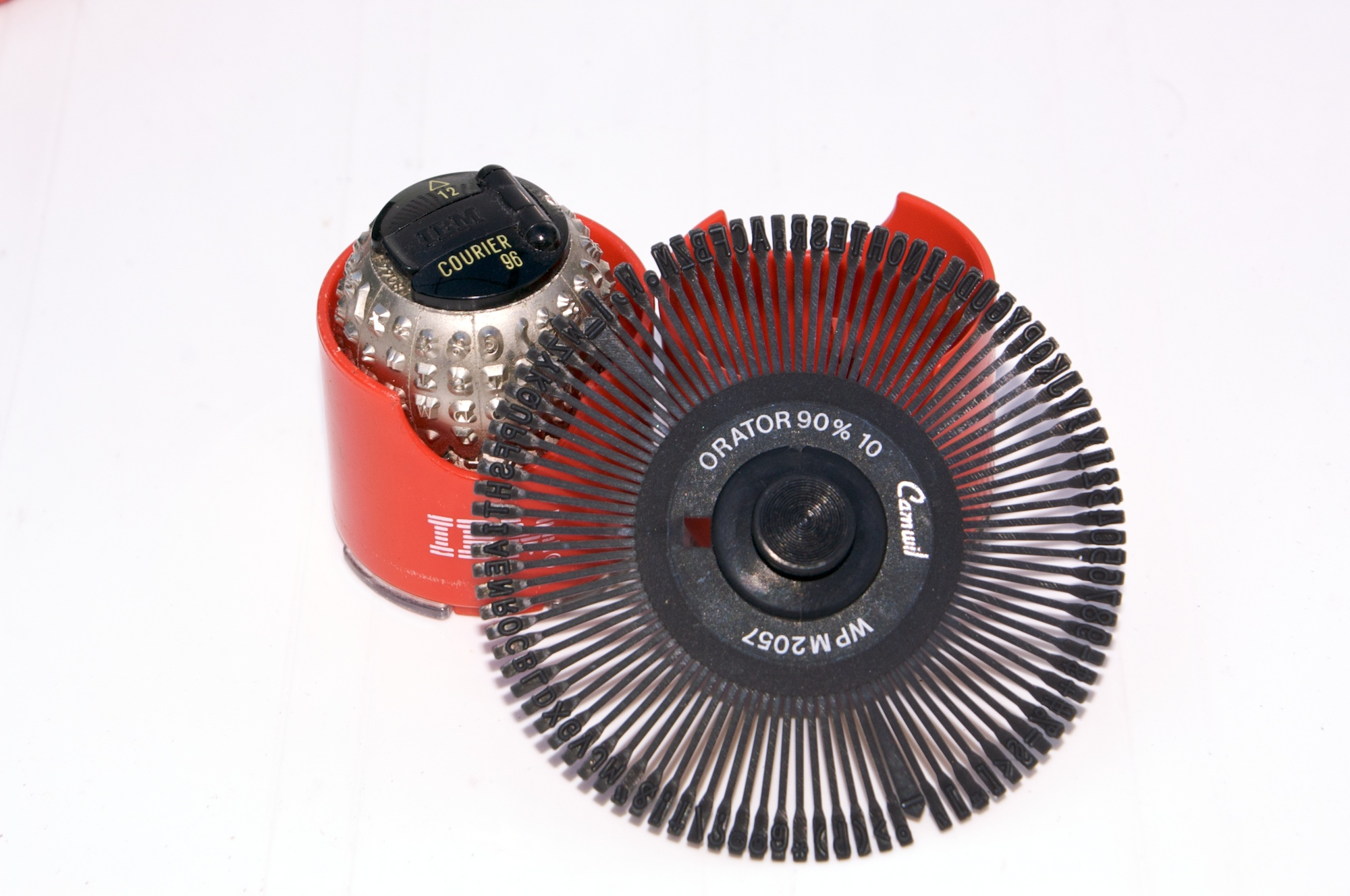
Selectric typing element, with a daisywheel printer element in the foreground

Since the keyboard was mechanically connected directly with the printer mechanism, keyboard character inputs were immediately typed by the printer mechanism, behavior called half-duplex by most of the computer industry. However, IBM insisted on calling this behavior full duplex, causing much confusion. If the computer system in turn echoed the typed input, having been configured to expect a full-duplex terminal, each character would be doubled. A further discussion of this terminology can be seen in the article on terminal emulation and elsewhere.

Another odd feature of the Selectric terminals was the "keyboard lock" mechanism. If the computer system a user was communicating with was too busy to accept input, it could send a code to mechanically interlock the keyboard so the user could not press any keys. The keyboard was also locked when the computer was typing, to avoid damaging the mechanism or interleaving user input and computer output in a confusing manner. Though done to protect the print mechanism from damage, an unexpected keyboard lock activation could cause minor injury to a typist with a heavy touch. There was little obvious warning that the keyboard had locked or unlocked, other than a faint click from the interlock solenoid that would be easily drowned out by the printer and fan noise in many computer facilities. There was a small indicator light, but this was of little help to fast touch typists whose gaze was fixed on copy they were transcribing.

The 2741 Selectric also had a special "print inhibit" feature. When the terminal received such a command from a host computer, the type element still operated, but did not print on the paper. This feature was used to avoid printing computer login passwords, and for other special purposes.

In spite of all these idiosyncrasies, between 1968 and about 1980, a Selectric-based printer was a relatively inexpensive and fairly popular way to get high-quality printed output from a computer. A minor industry developed to support small businesses and leading-edge hobbyists who would obtain a Selectric mechanism (which cost much less than a full-fledged 2741 terminal) and modify it to interface with industry-standard serial data communications.

The 96-character element introduced with the Selectric III and Electronic Typewriter series could (with some customizations) handle the full ASCII character set; by that point, however, the computer industry had moved on to much faster and mechanically simpler daisy wheel mechanisms such as the Diablo 630. The typewriter industry followed this trend shortly afterward, and even IBM replaced their Selectric lineup with its daisy wheel-based "Wheelwriter" series.

Similar machines referred to as the IBM 1050 series were used as the console printers for many computers, such as the IBM 1130 and the IBM System/360 series. The IBM 1050 was also offered in a remote terminal configuration, similar in use to the 2741. These were designed and manufactured for this purpose, including the necessary electrical interfaces, and incorporated more rugged components than the office Selectric or even the 2741.

== In popular culture ==
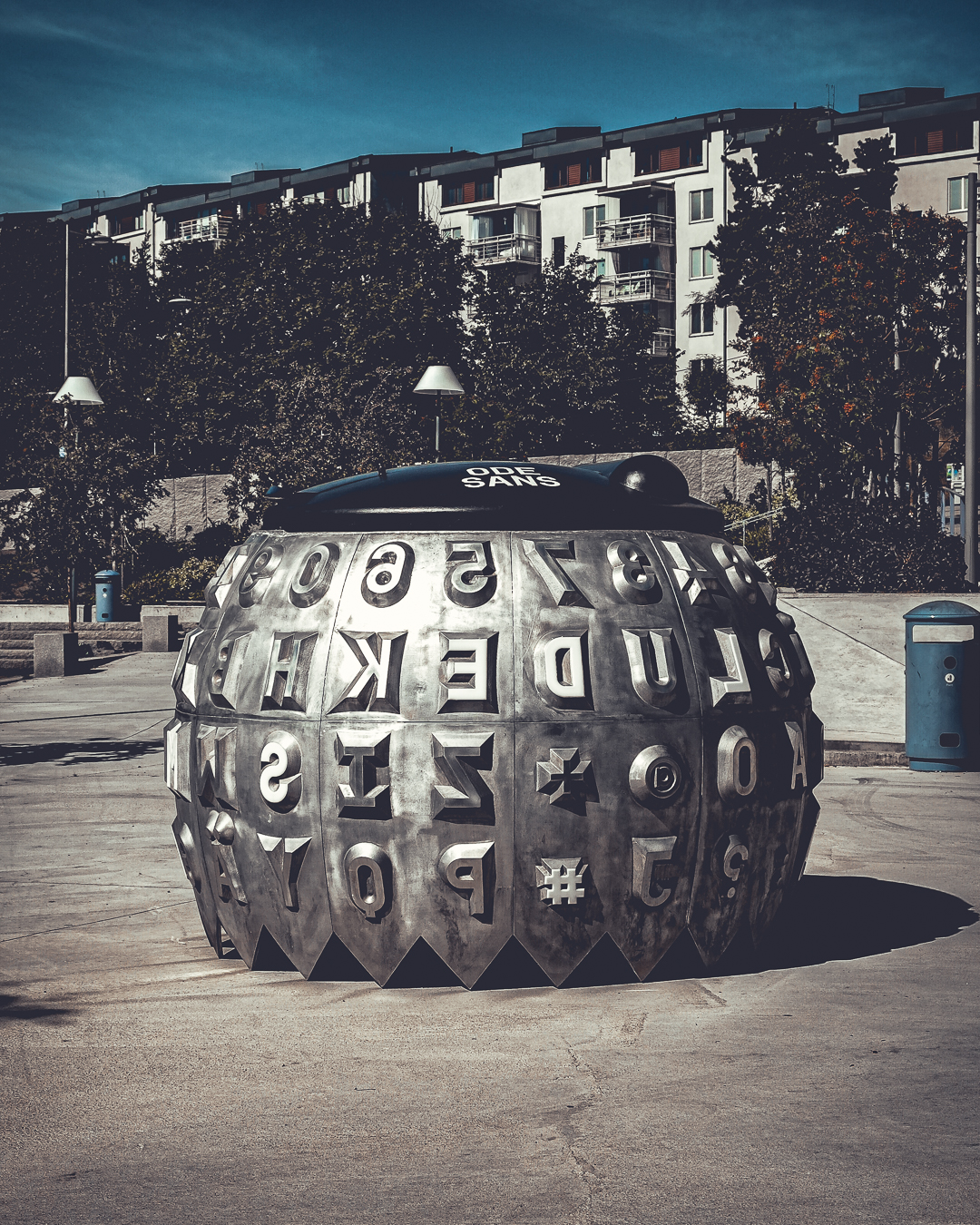
IBM Selectric typeball monument in Stockholm

- Capitalizing on the then-new Selectric typewriters, the IBM Pavilion at the 1964 New York World's Fair was a large theater shaped and styled to somewhat resemble a giant Selectric element.
- Notable Selectric users include Isaac Asimov, Hunter S. Thompson, David Sedaris, P. J. O'Rourke, Stephen J. Cannell (whose production logo featured him typing on a Selectric), and Philip K. Dick.
- The 1963 Perry Mason story "The Case of the Elusive Element" turned on the fact that the typing element in Selectric typewriters could easily be switched, making it impossible to know which machine had actually been used to type a message.
- Similarly, in the 1976 Columbo story "Now You See Him", Jack Cassidy's perfect murder is foiled when the detective reads the killer's motive on the victim's used Selectric II carbon film ribbon.
- In the 1971 horror novel The Exorcist, Father Dyer is found "typing on his IBM Selectric".
- The title sequence of Gerry Anderson's 1970 TV series UFO featured close-ups of a Selectric-based machine.
- In the TV series Mad Men, which is set during the early- to mid-1960s, Selectric II typewriters are featured prominently on the secretaries' desks, even though they were not introduced until 1971. In addition, the first season was set in 1960, when no Selectric model at all was yet available. In his 2008 DVD commentary, creator Matthew Weiner said the Selectric was chosen for his show for aesthetic reasons and because of the difficulty of assembling the required number of period-appropriate conventional electric typewriters.
- In Philip Roth's novel The Anatomy Lesson, Nathan Zuckerman dismisses the self-correcting Selectric II as "smug, puritanical, workmanlike" compared to his old Olivetti portable.
- In Régis Roinsard's 2012 film Populaire, about a boss training his secretary to become the 1959 world speed typing champion, he also invents the "golf ball" typewriter mechanism, which his American friend pitches to typewriter manufacturers with the words "America for business, France for love".
- In the TV series Fringe, a quantum entangled typewriter from the Selectric 251 series (which does not officially exist) is used by agents from a parallel universe to communicate with "the other side".
- A beige IBM Selectric is mentioned in the 1989 Stephen King novel The Dark Half. King mentions one again in the 2021 novel Later.
- A Selectric element ball was used as a graphic element for the Italian news program TG3 from 1987 to 1999.
