= Bomber (novel) =

War novel by Len Deighton

First edition (publ. Jonathan Cape)

Bomber is a novel by Len Deighton that was published in the United Kingdom in 1970. It is the fictionalised account of "the events relating to the last flight of an RAF Avro Lancaster bomber over Germany on the night of June 31st, 1943", a deliberately non-existent date, in which an RAF bombing raid on the Ruhr area of western Germany goes wrong. In each chapter, the plot is advanced by seeing the progress of the day through the eyes of protagonists on both sides of the conflict.

Bomber was the first novel to be written on a word processor, the IBM MT/ST.

== Plot summary ==
Sam Lambert is an experienced RAF Bomber Command Avro Lancaster pilot based in East Anglia. He has flown almost fifty bombing missions over Germany as part of the Combined Bomber Offensive since the start of the war. As Lambert nears his tour's end, he is developing signs of exhaustion. Lambert is an accomplished cricketer and the station commander needs his participation to assure victory against a rival. Lambert's refusals to do so make him unpopular with the Group Commander. His flight commander, an ambitious and unscrupulous flight lieutenant, leverages this and other half truths to force him out of flying, whilst at the same time replacing Lambert's best crewmen with poor performers. Nevertheless, his crew revere him and believe that he is the one factor that will ensure their survival.

Across the North Sea, Oberleutnant Victor Löwenherz, a Junkers Ju 88 night fighter pilot who intercepts RAF bombers in Defence of the Reich, dislikes the uncouth Nazi barbarians who rule the Fatherland. Fellow pilot Unteroffizier Christian Himmel is outraged to learn that Luftwaffe doctors are participating in Nazi human experimentation on concentration camp inmates. Himmel steals the results from an experiment and sends copies to other officers including Hermann Göring; he is sure that the Reichsmarschall will stop such disgraces to the air force's honour once he learns of them, although Löwenherz doubts that that will happen.

Near the Dutch border, people in the small German market town of Altgarten are aware of the war's progress but have not been bombed, unlike Cologne and other large cities in the heavily industrialized Ruhr. Oberleutnant August Bach commands a Freya radar unit on the Dutch coastline that tracks British bomber streams on their night-time raids against Germany. Despite being a highly decorated World War I veteran, Bach has never been promoted beyond Oberleutnant. He is a widower with an older son on the Eastern front, where Bach himself was serving until recently. While on a regular visit to his home in Altgarten, Bach proposes marriage to the young Reich Labor Service for Female Youth (RADwJ) member who cares for his younger son.

In Altgarten, the Bürgermeister finalises preparations for his own birthday banquet, at a restaurant in the medieval town square. While the town's hospital treats war injuries, and its TENO (Technische Nothilfe or "Civil Defence") engineers often work in the Ruhr and have experience with air raids, the fire department, although led by a veteran of the campaign that destroyed Köln, does not have such experience.

The RAF is organising a large raid on Krefeld in the Ruhr. The bomber crews relax and prepare for the ordeal. The men, their planes, weapons, responsibilities, attitudes, thoughts, and fears are described in great detail. There are frequent references to weather conditions, meteorological phenomena, and forecasts that add to the foreboding in the plot.

The bombs are loaded into the Lancasters, the German radars "warm up", and the fighter pilots adjust their night vision. Superstitions, rites, and rituals are respected as the combatants ready themselves.

The British bomber stream forms up and avoids known flak concentrations and searchlight batteries. Despite the meticulous planning, things go wrong immediately: A Lancaster almost crashes on take-off; a Ju 88 crashes into the sea after a bird strike over the IJsselmeer; another is shot down by a friendly flak-ship. As German radar tracks the bombers, tiny pieces of shrapnel from an 88mm anti-aircraft shell destroy Lancasters, each costing more than £42,000 ($2.22 million in 2024). A pathfinder Mosquito is downed and the marker bombs it is carrying explode southeast of Altgarten; with little flak and clear bombing conditions, Christmas Tree marker pyrotechnics are placed over the wrong target. Creepback causes the carpet bombing of a town of 5,000 inhabitants by a force designed for a city.

The raid's two waves cause a firestorm that destroys Altgarten; many of the main characters on both sides die or lose those close to them. Despite the attack completely missing its industrial target no one is punished for the failure, but Himmel and Lambert are executed and demoted, respectively, for non-combat reasons. The book ends with an epilogue which gives details of the post-raid lives of the major characters.

== Viewpoints ==
- The crew of RAF Lancaster bomber, nicknamed "Creaking Door", particularly its pilot, Flight Sergeant Sam Lambert
- August Bach, the commanding officer of a Luftwaffe radar station on the Dutch coast
- Oberleutnant Victor Löwenherz, an aristocratic Luftwaffe night fighter pilot and his fellow crew members
- Bach's housekeeper/mistress, Anna-Luisa, and his young son, Hansl, at their home in Altgarten, a small German village close to the Dutch border
- Altgarten's Bürgermeister, fire chief, civil defence (TENO) engineers and various residents

== Legacy ==
Bomber is highly regarded by some critics. Anthony Burgess, in Ninety-nine Novels, cited it as one of the 99 best novels in English since 1939.

In 1979 Motörhead frontman, Lemmy, dedicated the band's third album Bomber to Len Deighton, as it was his novel that had inspired the title track.

Bomber was announced, on 1 February 2010, as one of twenty-one titles longlisted for the "Lost Man Booker Prize" of 1970, a contest delayed by 40 years because a reshuffling of the fledgling competition's rules that year disqualified nearly a year's worth of high-quality fiction from consideration. The book did not make the shortlist.

== Adaptation ==
In 1995 the BBC's Radio 4 broadcast a "real time" dramatisation of Deighton's documentary novel Bomber, covering the novel's action following RAF Lancaster bomber O-Orange's take-off in 1943, life in the German town that was its allocated target, the bombing raid and the plane's return at night. The drama threaded through the station's unchangeable schedule of news and current affairs from early morning to midnight. It starred Tom Baker as the narrator, Frank Windsor as Air Marshal Harris, Samuel West as Lambert, Emma Chambers and Jack Shepherd and told how the raid had "changed the lives" of many men and women – British and German. It was repeated on Radio 4 Extra on Armistice Day 2011.
