= IBM Wheelwriter =

Electronic typewriter introduced in 1984

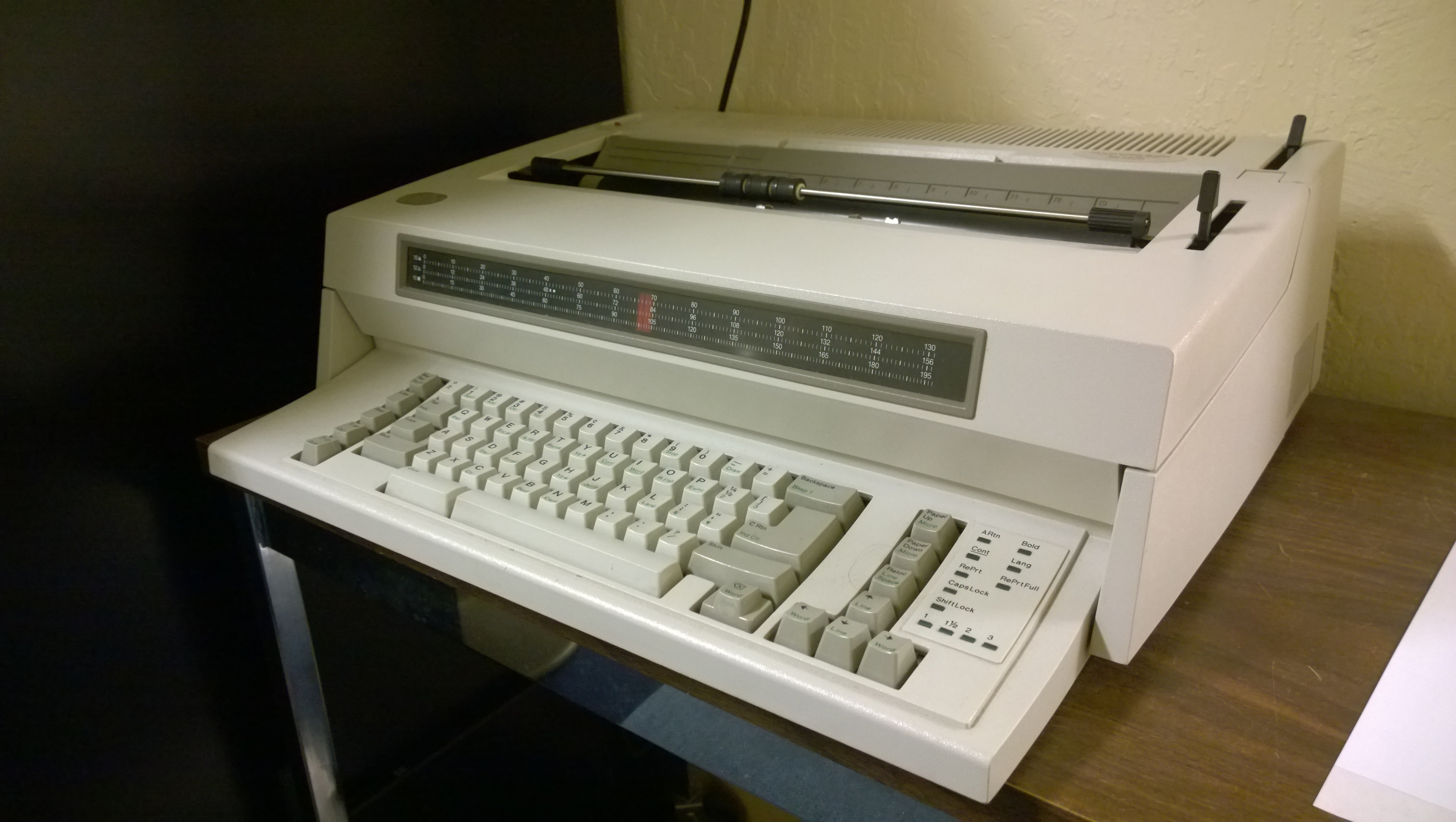
- The IBM Wheelwriter 15 (Series II) from 1988
- Developer: International Business Machines Corporation (IBM)
- Manufacturer: IBM Information Products Corporation (1984–1991); Lexmark International (1991–2002)
- Type: Electronic typewriter
- Released: October 1984; 42 years ago
- Predecessor: IBM Selectric

The Wheelwriter is a line of electronic typewriters that was manufactured by International Business Machines Corporation (IBM) from 1984 to 1991 and by Lexmark International (a spin-off of IBM) from 1991 to 2001. Typewriters in the Wheelwriter series use swappable daisy wheel cartridges to produce high-quality letterforms on the page via an ink ribbon and an impact printing head. Cartridges can be swapped out to allow the user to switch between a wide array of typefaces. The Wheelwriter was IBM's first daisy wheel typewriter and represented the technical apex of IBM's typewriter families, replacing their long-lived and commercially successful IBM Selectric typewriter series on its introduction in 1984.

== Features ==
All models in the Wheelwriter range possess some amount of electronic memory, acting as a data buffer and allowing for a number of advanced features, including algorithmic centering of text on a line, basic spell-checking, and word-by-word erasure of text (either via white correction ribbon or via lift-off adhesive correction ribbon), among other features. The Wheelwriter can print in 10, 12, or 15 pitch monospaced fonts. All models except the Wheelwriter 3 and Actionwriter can use proportionally spaced print wheels.

The Wheelwriter is an electronic typewriter, meaning the keyboard is in no way mechanically linked to the printing function. The previous generation Selectric is an electrically assisted mechanical typewriter, relying on a single electric motor to power what can be considered a mechanical computer. The Wheelwriter is a keyboard and daisy wheel printer linked by a computer designed for typing Because of the drastically reduced number of moving parts, the Wheelwriter was considered by IBM engineers to be much more reliable and required less servicing than the Selectric.

A variant of the Wheelwriter, called the Wheelprinter, is essentially a Wheelwriter without the keyboard and with a parallel communication interface, allowing it to be used with a number of personal computers (including IBM's own PC). The Wheelprinter is capable of printing 25 characters per second.

Later entries in the line are capable of storing entire pages (for perfect duplication) and moving the printhead over predefined locations on a page (useful for batch filling out form fields). Such late models include such models as the Wheelwriter 1000 and Wheelwriter 7000 (the former for classroom and home use and the latter for enterprise use).

== History ==
The Wheelwriter was introduced in October 1984 with two models: the Wheelwriter 3 and the Wheelwriter 5; the Wheelprinter was also announced simultaneously. The Wheelwriter was IBM's first daisy wheel typewriter and served as the successor to their long-lived and commercially successful IBM Selectric typewriter series. At the time of their release, IBM continued to produce the Selectric III, Personal Typewriter, and two Electronic Typewriters—the Models 85 and 95 for a number of months. All models in the Wheelwriter series were manufactured by IBM's Information Products division out of its Lexington, Kentucky, headquarters.

Alongside the Wheelwriter, IBM released the Quietwriter, a thermal-transfer printing typewriter which was marketed towards noise-sensitive applications. Instead of striking the ribbon to get ink onto paper, the Quietwriter heats up the printhead in specific patterns to transfer ink from the ribbon. Models in the line include the Quietwriter 7, 8, System/20 and System/40.

In 1985, IBM introduced the Actionwriter, a cost-reduced version of the Wheelwriter intended for home users, small businesses, and schools. Unlike the rest of the series, the Actionwriter was manufactured under agreement by Triumph-Adler in West Germany for IBM. The Actionwriter was revamped in 1988, with IBM renaming it the Personal Wheelwriter, aligning its design and functionality closer to the rest of the models in the Wheelwriter line. During this time, IBM released the Wheelwriter 10 Series II, 30, 50, and 70 Series II, with the last three including displays for the operator to preview and edit text.

In 1991, the IBM Information Products Corporation was spun off into its own corporation, Lexmark International, who subsequently retained the tooling and manufacturing rights to the Wheelwriter series. Wheelwriters continued to be marketed as IBM products and were distributed and resold by the latter.

As the personal computer grew in market share, the market for typewriters was waning. In 1993, although the typewriter industry was valued at $350 million, one analyst concluded a decline in revenue of 17% per year; Lexmark was the only company to increase revenue. The features of the Wheelwriters incrementally improved. For example, the Wheelwriter 2000 has 32KB of memory and a number of automated formatting features including bold, sub- and super-script, and foreign language support.

By 1995, however, manufacturing of the Wheelwriter was relegated to one production line out of Lexmark's Lexington facility. By the late 1990s, the Wheelwriter was one of the last electronic typewriters still manufactured in the United States, Lexmark holding a majority of the American market share in that category. In 1999, Lexmark's typewriter sales was "so small that it [did] not even rate a mention in the annual report".

The Wheelwriter line was discontinued between the end of 2001 and the beginning of 2002.

As of 2023, since it was discontinued, typewriters including the Wheelwriter continue to be used by writers and businesses in part because of the convenience for addressing letters and filling out forms.

== In popular culture ==
- Joan Didion owned two Wheelwriter 5 typewriters in her apartment, one of which sold for $5,500 and the other $6,000 in 2022.
