= IBM MT/ST =

IBM Selectric typewriter model

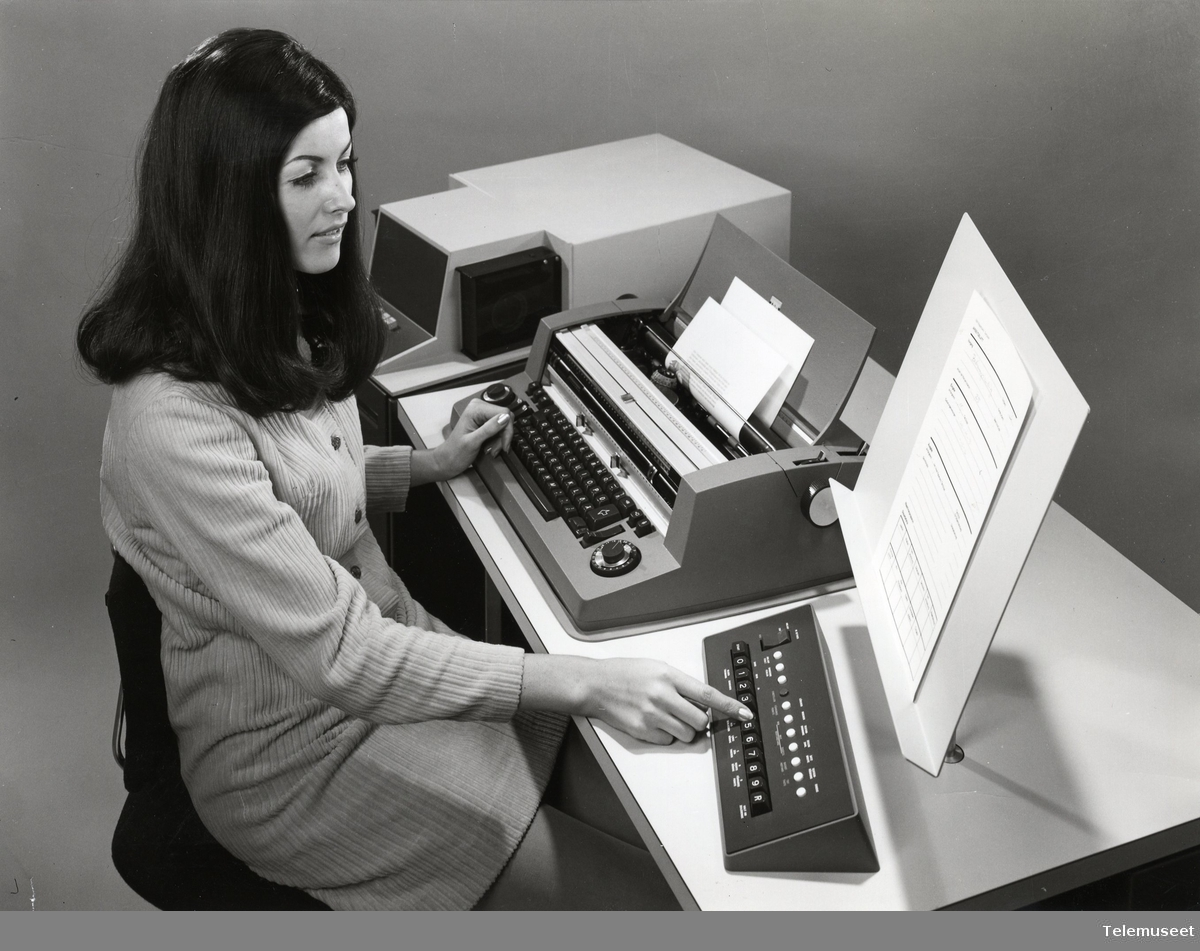
IBM Magnetic Tape/Selectric Composer (MT/SC) in use

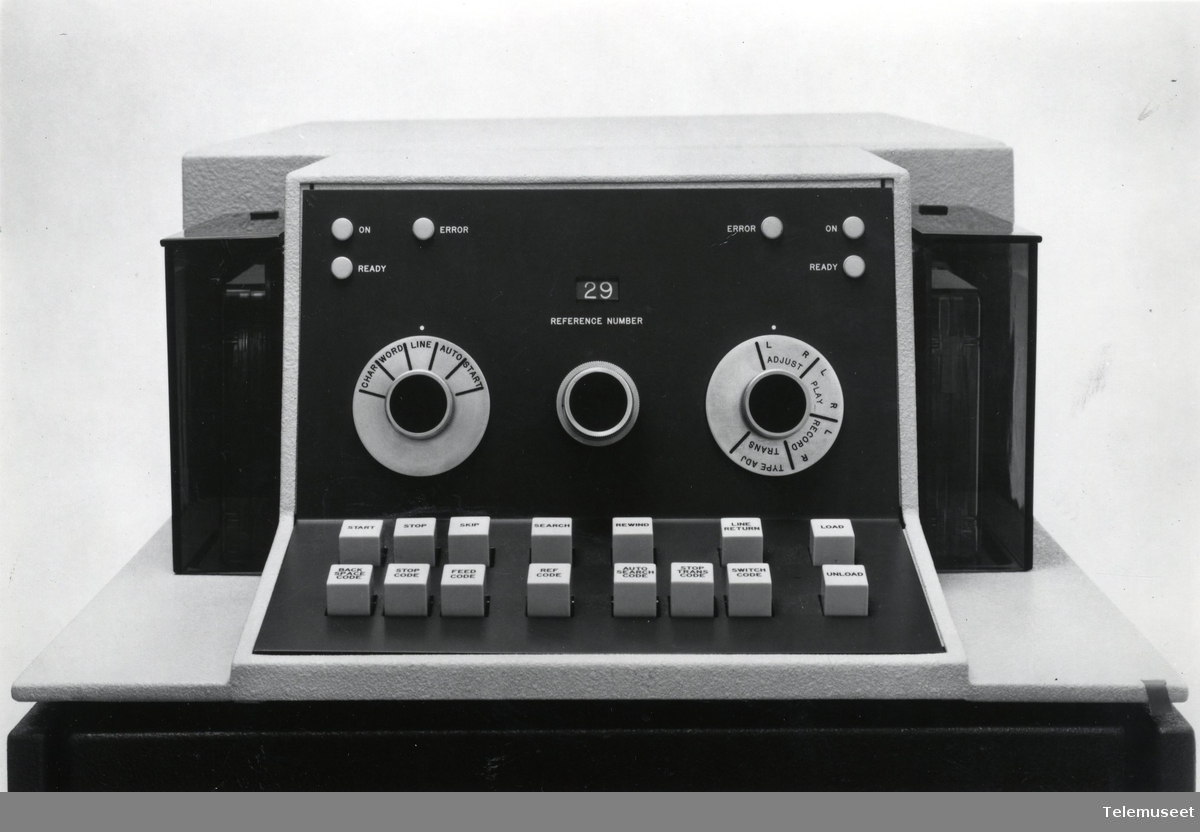
Panel of MT/ST

The IBM MT/ST (Magnetic Tape/Selectric Typewriter, and known in Europe as MT72) is a model of the IBM Selectric typewriter, built into its own desk, integrated with magnetic tape recording and playback facilities, located in an attached enclosure, with controls and a bank of relays. It was released by IBM in 1964.

== Description ==
The MT/ST records text typed on 1/2" magnetic tape, approximately 25 kilobytes per tape cassette, and allows editing and re-recording during playback. It was the first system marketed as a word processor. Most models have two tape drives, which greatly facilitates revision, and enables features such as mail merge. A module adds a third tape station, to record the combined output of playback from the two stations.

The MT/ST automates word wrap, but it has no screen, automated hyphenation (soft hyphens are available), or concept of a page; pages have to be divided and numbered by the human operator during playback. Instruction manuals taught the operator the importance of listening to the sounds of the machine during playback. The backspace key backs up the tape so a character can be recorded over; there is also a true backspace code, which allows overstruck characters, like á. Insertion capabilities are limited; one can insert while copying from one tape station to the other. On a single tape one null character per line is reserved for insertions. A "switch code" instructs the playback to switch to the other tape drive. In a cumbersome way, points on the tape can be marked and jumped to.

The MT/ST is not electronic; it implemented its functions through a bank of electromechanical relays.

In 1967 IBM hired Muppets creator Jim Henson to produce and direct a short film on the MT/ST; the film, called Paperwork Explosion, was scored by electronic music pioneer Raymond Scott.

Because of its high purchase price, most customers rented the system. The MT/ST became obsolete in the 1970s, when it was displaced by floppy disk-based systems. IBM discontinued support in 1983.

== Users ==
IBM's largest German customer, Allianz, used MT/ST to produce form letters based on prewritten text. "14 23 56", for example, was the "Death Tape", a letter of condolences that requested documents from survivors of the deceased and promised prompt insurance claim processing.

The first novel to be written on a word processor, Len Deighton's 1970 Second World War historical novel Bomber, about an RAF Bomber Command raid over Germany, was written on the MT/ST.

The MT/ST was also used as a data entry device for early issues of the RILM Abstracts scholarly publication at the City University of New York Graduate Center. Cartridges created on the MT/ST were read by an IBM 2495 Tape Cartridge Reader onto an IBM System/360 mainframe for further processing before being sent to be printed.

== MT/SC ==
The IBM MT/SC (Magnetic Tape Selectric Composer) appeared in 1967. It is an output device which plays back tapes recorded and edited on the MT/ST. It is physically similar to the MT/ST, but its tape unit has only one tape reader. Built into the desk, instead of the Selectric typewriter, is an IBM Selectric Composer, previously an unautomated device. It uses typeballs similar to but not interchangeable with those of the Selectric, with three type sizes (10, 12, and 15 characters per inch), fractional interword spacing, bold, italic (but not bold italic), and a variety of serif and sans-serif typefaces, such as Bodoni, Univers, Times Roman, and the like. It produces fully justified, camera-ready output, but the manual version requires that each line be typed twice, once to calculate the size of the precise interword spaces and a repeat typing to precisely insert them.

The MT/SC automates the Composer, and it prints at approximately the speed of the Selectric typewriter, automating the interword spaces and thus justifying the output. The MT/ST and MT/SC combination (two machines) put the rapid production of camera-ready copy, for the first time, within the budget of a small to medium-sized publisher. However, the need to stop the Composer twice whenever a typeface was changed or italic is used (once to change it and again to change it back), sometimes multiple times in the same sentence, can significantly slow down the procedure. The choice of element to be changed—which typeball would be installed—is manual and uses information given to the operator but not encoded in the data stream. Like a typesetter, for example, the operator needs to know that titles are italicized.

The logic of the MT/SC is implemented by an electronic microprogrammed controller.

== IBM 2495 Tape Cartridge Reader ==
The IBM 2495 Tape Cartridge Reader allows input from tapes created on the MT/ST to a System/360. The 2495 has a hopper and a stacker that can hold up to twelve tapes. The autoloader loads a cartridge in five seconds, and reads or rewinds at 900 characters per second. It attaches to a System/360 Model 30, 40, or 50 via a multiplexor channel. The OS/360 utility IEBTCRIN was used to read data from the 2495.

== IBM Pollyanna Principle ==
The IBM Pollyanna Principle is an axiom that states "machines should work; people should think."

This can be understood as a statement of extreme optimism, that machines should do all the hard work, freeing people to think (hence the reference to Pollyanna), or as a cynical statement, suggesting that most of the world's major problems result from machines that fail to work, and people who fail to think.

"In 1967, Henson was contracted by IBM to make a film extolling the virtues of their new technology, the MT/ST, a primitive word processor.

The film would explore how the MT/ST would help control the massive amount of documents generated by a typical business office. Paperwork Explosion, produced in October 1967, is a quick-cut montage of images and words illustrating the intensity and pace of modern business. Henson collaborated with Raymond Scott on the electronic sound track." ~ The Jim Henson Company

IBM machines can do the work
So that people have time to think
Machines should do the work
That's what they're best at
People should do the thinking
That's what they're best at
Machines should work
People should think
Machines should work
People should think
Machines should work
People should think

~ "Paperwork Explosion"

== See also ==
- IBM document processors
- IBM Electromatic Table Printing Machine
