= James B. Hammond =

American journalist & inventor (1839-1913)

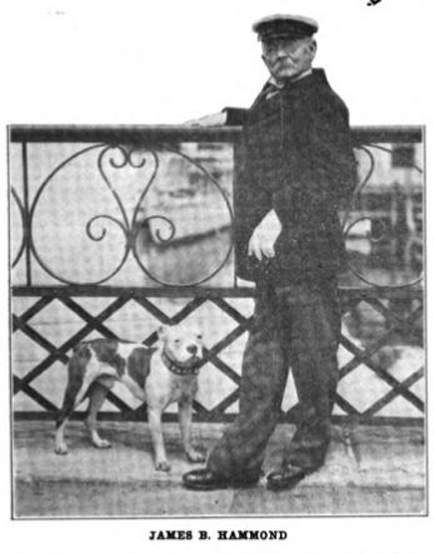
- Hammond in front of his yacht, the Lounger II
- Born: James Bartlett Hammond; April 23, 1839; South Boston, Massachusetts
- Died: January 27, 1913 (aged 73) off St. Augustine, Florida
- Education: University of Vermont; Union Theological Seminary
- Occupation(s): Inventor, journalist, entrepreneur
- Notable work: Hammond Typewriter
- Spouse: Jeannette Maxwell (m. 1897)

James Bartlett Hammond (April 23, 1839 – January 27, 1913) was an American journalist, inventor, entrepreneur, and philanthropist.

== Biography ==
Born in South Boston, Hammond was a student at Boston Latin School and Phillips Academy in Andover, Massachusetts. He graduated from the University of Vermont in 1861.

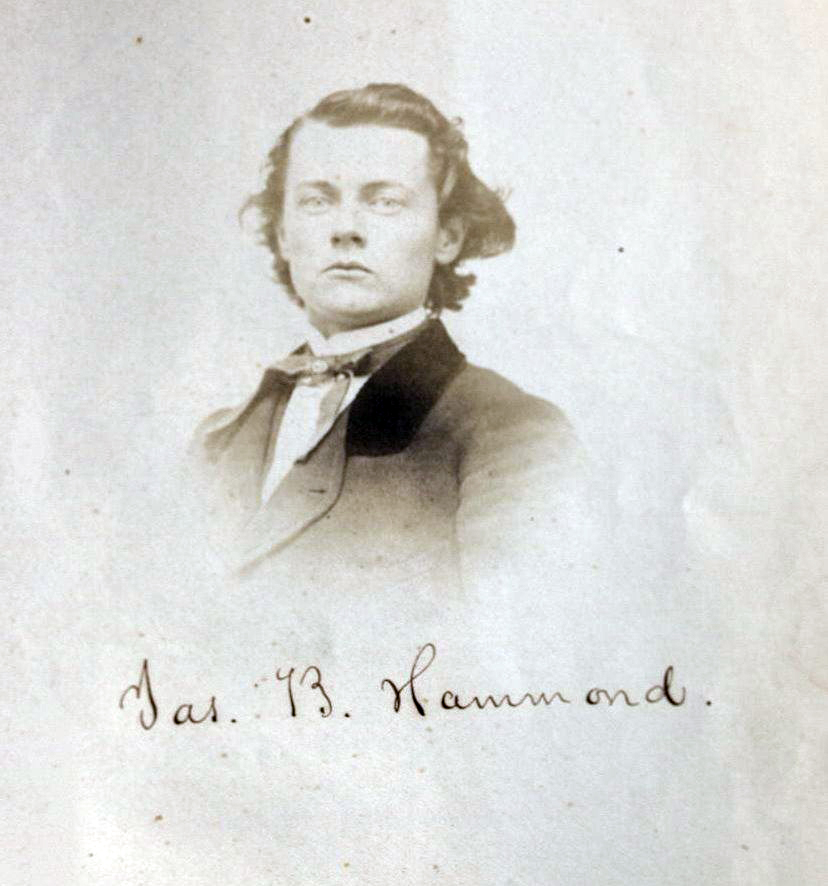
Hammond at the University of Vermont, 1861

During the American Civil War, he was a war correspondent for the New York Tribune. During and after the war, he attended Union Theological Seminary, graduating in 1865. He studied at the University of Halle from 1865 to 1866. For the 1870-1871 school year, Hammond taught at the Ames School in Boston. During the school year there was an incident in which he allegedly throttled one of his students during class and was charged with assault and battery. In the initial court proceeding he was found guilty and fined $10. Upon appeal there was a hung jury. From 1872 to 1879 Hammond resided in New York City where he had a school known as Mr. Hammond's School.

Turning his attention to mechanical improvements, in 1880 he invented one of the first typewriting machines that was built on scientific principles and with a true alignment. In 1884 the typewriter was placed on the market, and its manufacture netted him a large fortune.

The Hammond Typewriter won for its inventor the Elliott Cresson Medal in 1890.

Hammond married Jeannette Maxwell on September 15, 1897 in Boston. He died in 1913 aboard his yacht near St. Augustine, Florida. He was estranged from his wife at the time of his death, and his will left his patents to Manhattan's Metropolitan Museum of Art.
