= Hammond typewriter =

Typewriter by James Bartlett

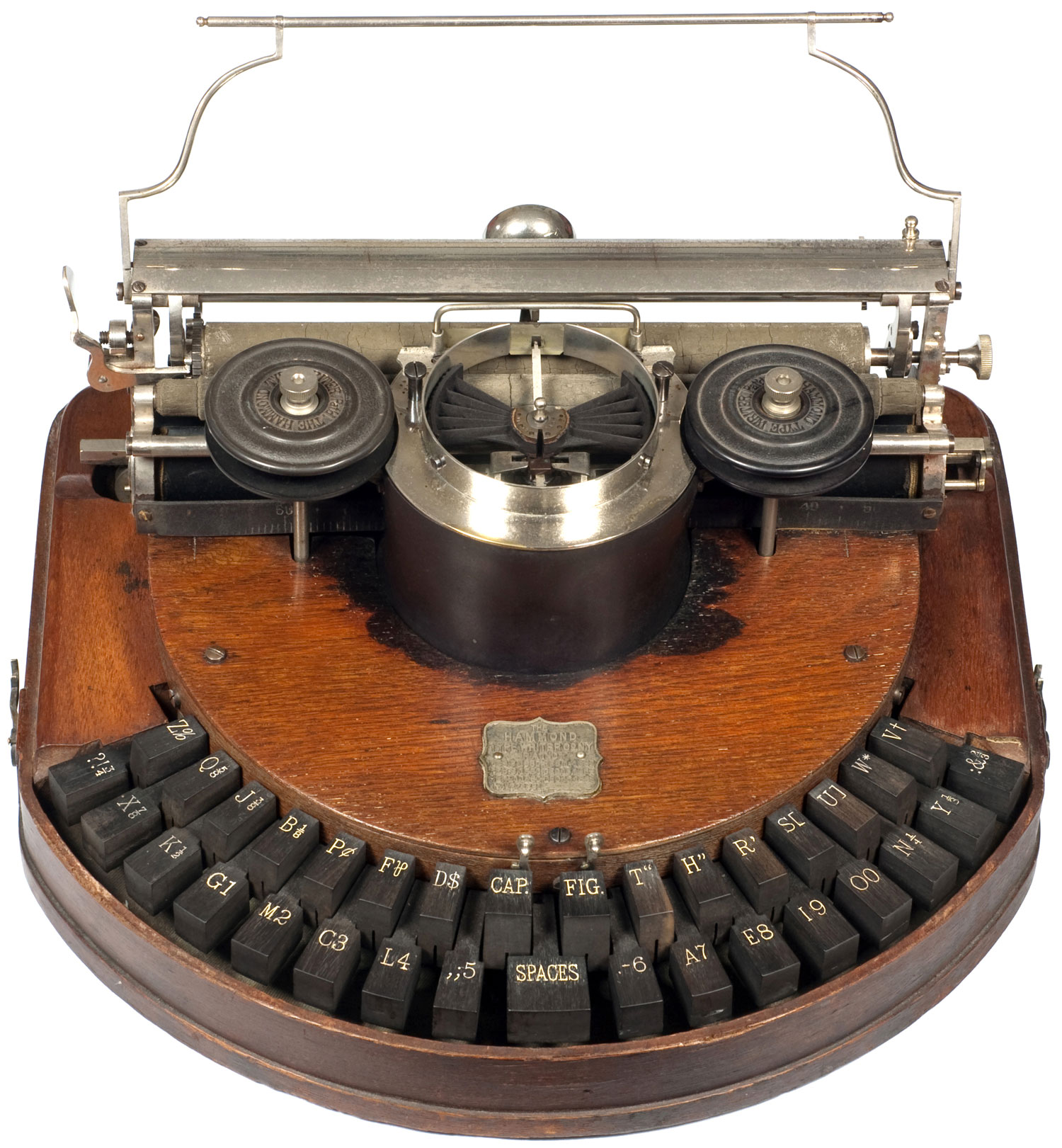
Hammond 1 typewriter, 1885

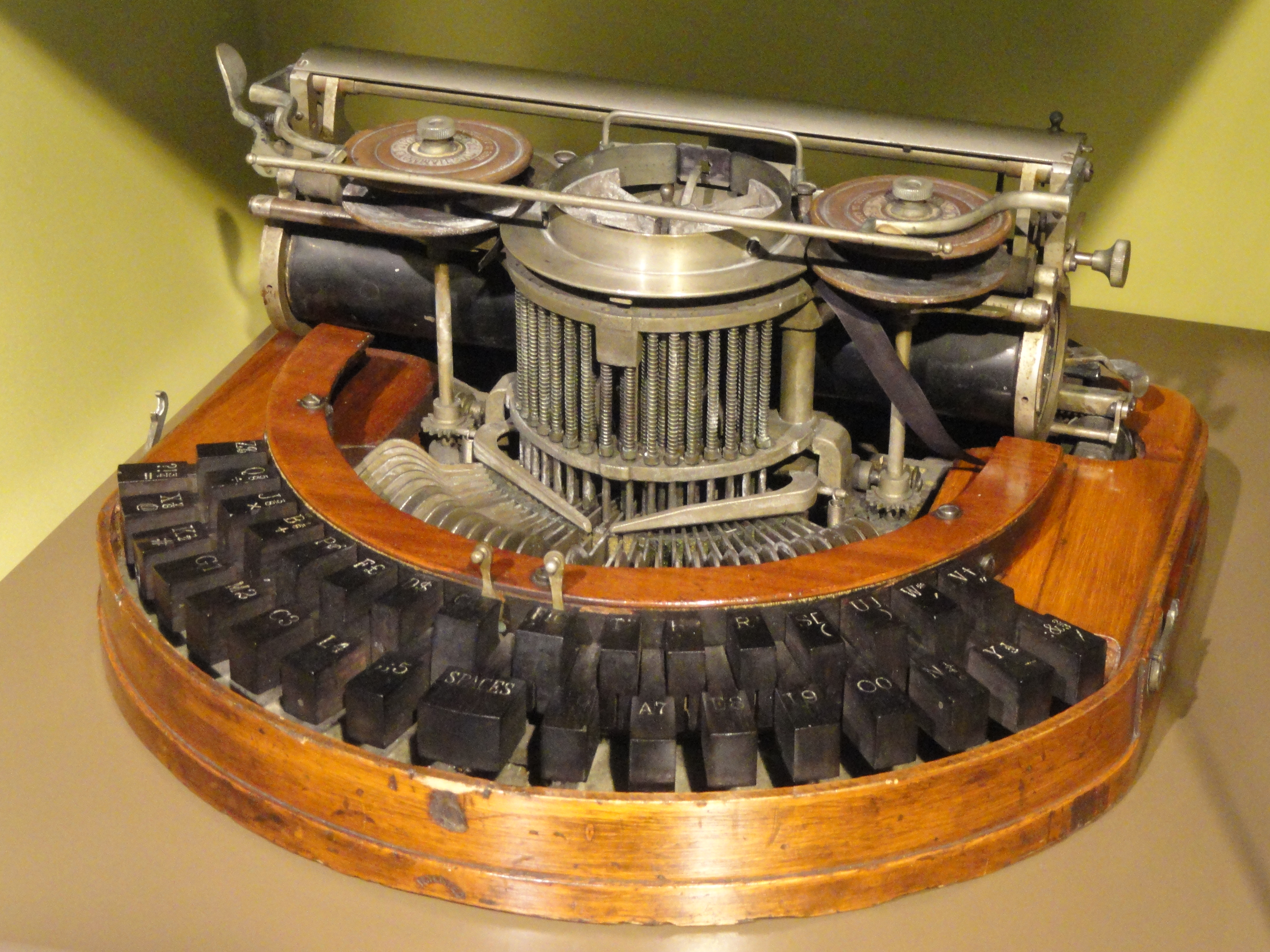
Hammond No. 1, Hammond Typewriter Co.

Hammond was one of the early commercial typewriters from late 19th century and was sold up until the late 20th century. It was invented by James Bartlett Hammond in 1880, first manufactured 1881, and released in 1884. John Pratt sold his typewriter patent rights in 1882 to the Hammond Typewriter Company for the manufacture of the typewriter.

== Design ==
The Hammond came with a case and was designed with a curved keyboard. It became popular because of its superior print quality and changeable typeface, which was also available as foundry type from the Inland Type Foundry. The type is carried on a pair of interchangeable rotating sectors, one controlled by each half of the keyboard. A small hammer pushes the paper against the ribbon and type sector to print each character. The mechanism was later adapted to give a straight QWERTY keyboard and proportional spacing as can be seen on later models, including variations of the Hammond 1 model.

Later it was adapted with a tactile interface and Braille output to allow the production and consumption of text by and for blind people. This adaptation was initiated in 1875 by Sir Francis Campbell, co-founder of the Royal National College for the Blind. Helen Keller used a Hammond Typewriter during her college years.
