= List of Kaypro games =

There were a number of games available for the monochrome Kaypro computers. There are currently 47 commercial games on this list.

== Models II, IV, 4, 10 and 2x ==
Title	Publisher	Description/Notes	Compatible Models
Airport	Software Toolworks	Air traffic controller simulation; manage aircraft on radar.	II, 4, 10
Aliens	Kaypro		
Backgammon 2.0	Dynacomp, Inc.	Board game vs. computer or human; follows official rules.	II, 4, 10
Battlefield	Dynacomp, Inc.	Collection of eight war-themed games.	II, 4, 10
Black Jack Coach	Dynacomp, Inc.	Blackjack trainer with strategy coaching.	II, 4, 10
Bridge Master	Dynacomp, Inc.	Bridge card game with bidding conventions.	II, 4, 10
CatChum	Kaypro		
Chess Master	Dynacomp, Inc.	Chess vs. computer; multiple levels and features.	II, 4, 10
Cranston Manor Adventure	Dynacomp, Inc.	Text adventure: collect treasures in a manor.	II, 4, 10
Crypto	Dynacomp, Inc.	Cryptography puzzle game with quotes to decipher.	II, 4, 10
Cutthroats	Infocom, Inc.	Text adventure: underwater treasure hunt.	II
Deadline	Infocom, Inc.	Mystery text adventure as a detective.	II
Enchanter	Infocom, Inc.	Fantasy text adventure; first in series.	II
Flight Simulator	Dynacomp, Inc.	Airplane piloting simulation.	II, 4, 10
Games Pack I	Dynacomp, Inc.	Compilation: Catapult, Lunar Lander, Switch, Blackjack, Horse Race, Craps, Slot Machine.	II, 4, 10
Games Pack II	Dynacomp, Inc.	Compilation: Jotto, AceyDeucy, Crazy Eights, Life, Wumpus, Number Guess, Calendar.	II, 4, 10
Go Fish	Dynacomp, Inc.	Card game adaptation.	II, 4, 10
Gumball Rally Adventure	Dynacomp, Inc.	Adventure/racing-themed game.	II, 4, 10
Hitchhiker's Guide to the Galaxy	Infocom, Inc.	Humorous sci-fi text adventure.	II
Infidel	Infocom, Inc.	Text adventure: pyramid exploration.	II
Ironclads	Dynacomp, Inc.	Naval battle simulation.	II, 4, 10
Ladder	Kaypro		
Ladder Network	Dynacomp, Inc.	Puzzle/strategy (likely variant of Ladder).	II, 4, 10
Management Simulator	Dynacomp, Inc.	Business management game.	II, 4, 10
Master Drill	Dynacomp, Inc.	Educational drill game.	II, 4, 10
MyChess	Software Toolworks	Chess with multiple levels; championship winner.	II, 4, 10
Nemesis	SuperSoft Inc.	Dungeons & Dragons-style RPG.	II, 4, 10
Planetfall	Infocom, Inc.	Sci-fi text adventure.	II
Poker Party	Dynacomp, Inc.	Poker card game.	II, 4, 10
Seastalker	Infocom, Inc.	Adventure game.	II
Snake	Software Toolworks	Snake game with variations.	II, 4, 10
Sorcerer	Infocom, Inc.	Adventure game.	II
Space Evacuation	Dynacomp, Inc.	Space-themed strategy/evacuation.	II, 4, 10
Space Lanes	Dynacomp, Inc.	Space trading (variant of Star Lanes?).	II, 4, 10
Spellbreaker	Infocom, Inc.	Adventure game.	II
Star Jump	SuperSoft Inc.	Interstellar conflict real-time game.	II, 4, 10
Starbase 3	Dynacomp, Inc.	Space base management/sim.	II, 4, 10
Starcross	Infocom, Inc.	Adventure game.	II
Star Trek	Kaypro		
Suspect	Infocom, Inc.	Adventure game.	II
Suspended	Infocom, Inc.	Adventure game.	II
Telengard	Avalon Hill Microcomputer Games	Dungeon exploration RPG.	II
Trivia+Plus	SRS Systems		
Trivia+Plus Baseball Edition	SRS Systems		
Wishbringer	Infocom, Inc.	Adventure game.	II
Zork I: The Great Underground Empire	Infocom, Inc.	Classic text adventure.	II
Zork II: The Wizard of Frobozz	Infocom, Inc.	Sequel text adventure.	II
Zork III: The Dungeon Master	Infocom, Inc.	Final Zork trilogy text adventure.	II
