= Xerox 820 =

Desktop computer developed by Xerox

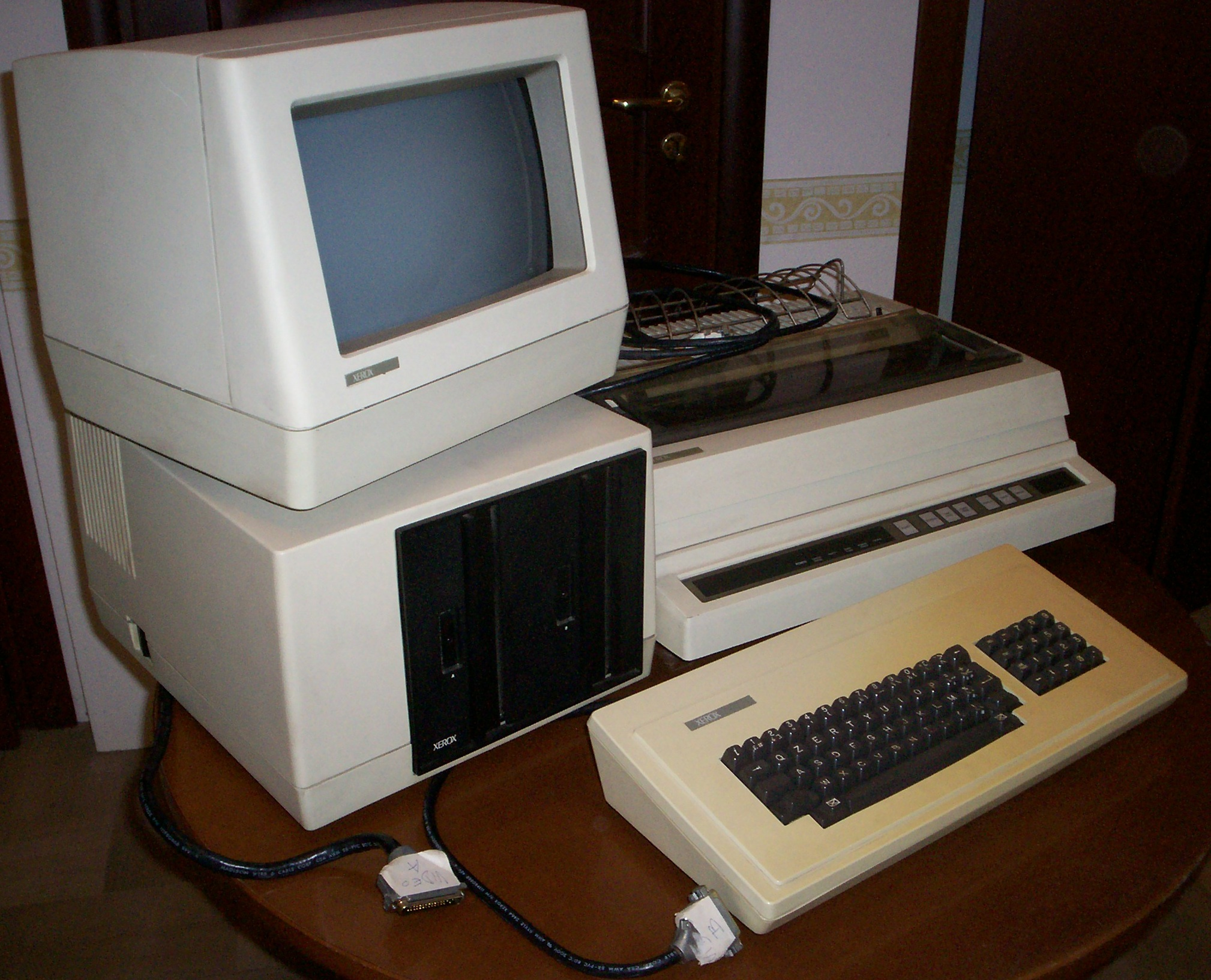
- Xerox 820
- Manufacturer: Xerox
- Released: June 1981; 44 years ago
- Discontinued: 1985
- Media: 96 kB 5¼-inch floppy disks, 300 kB 8-inch floppy disks
- Operating system: CP/M 2.2
- CPU: Zilog Z80A clocked at 2.5 MHz
- Memory: 64 KB RAM, 4 KB to 8 KB ROM
- Display: Mono CRT, 80 x 24 characters text, two intensity levels
- Graphics: TTL / composite video CRT interface
- Input: Keyboard
- Dimensions: 32.8 × 38.1 × 34.3 cm
- Weight: 13.6 kg (30 lb)

The Xerox 820 Information Processor is an 8-bit desktop computer sold by Xerox in the early 1980s. The computer runs under the CP/M operating system and uses floppy disk drives for mass storage. The microprocessor board is a licensed variant of the Big Board computer.

== 820 ==
Xerox introduced the 820 in June 1981 for $2,995 with two 5 1/4-inch single-density disk drives with 81K of capacity per diskette, or $3,795 with two 8-inch drives with 241K capacity. To beat the IBM PC to market, Xerox created little of the computer's design; it is based on the Ferguson Big Board computer kit and other off-the-shelf components, including a Zilog Z80 processor clocked at 2.5 MHz, and 64 KB of RAM.

Xerox chose CP/M as its operating system because of the large software library—The 820 is compatible with all Big Board software—and sold a customized version of WordStar for $495, although by 1982 the company offered the standard version for the same price.

By 1984, surplus 820 mainboards were available from Xerox for about $50 each, and one of these could be combined with other surplus components to build a working system for a few hundred dollars.

== 820-II ==
=== Overview ===
The Xerox 820-II followed in 1982, featuring a Z80A processor clocked at 4.0 MHz. Pricing started at US$3,000 (equivalent to $10,000 in 2025).

Hardware: The processor board is located inside the CRT unit, and includes the Z80A, 64 KB of RAM and a boot ROM which enables booting from any of the supported external drives in 8-bit mode.

Screen: The display is a 24-line, 80-character (7×10 dot matrix) white-on-black monochrome CRT, with software-selectable variations such as reverse video, blinking, low-intensity (equivalent to grey text), and 4×4-resolution graphics.

Communication ports: These include two 25-pin RS-232 serial ports (including one intended for a Xerox 620 or 630 printer or compatible, and one intended for a modem), and two optional parallel ports which can be added via an internal pin header, usable with a Xerox or other cable.

Keyboard: A bulky 96-character ASCII keyboard with a 10-key numeric keypad and a cursor diamond which otherwise defaults to Ctrl-A to Ctrl-D. It also includes HELP and LINE FEED keys, and is attached to the back of the CRT unit by a thick cable.

Software: A typical 820-II comes with CP/M 2.2, diagnostic software, WordStar, and Microsoft's BASIC-80 programming language.

=== Expansion ===
The Xerox 820-II is different from the 820:

1. the 820 mainboard has a floppy disk controller (Western Digital FD1771) but no hard disk controller or any expansion bay capabilities, whereas
2. the 820-II mainboard has no built-in disk controller nor a built-in processor expansion capability (these are required to be on expansion bay cards; there are two different expansion bay connectors, one which accommodates one of several disk I/O boards, and one which accommodates a processor board—the processor board was the taller of the two).

The Xerox 820-II's disk I/O capability is on one of two different cards:

1. a floppy disk I/O card, which can control external 8" or 5.25" floppies, or a mixture of these, as configured by special external cables, and
2. a SCSI hard disk/floppy disk I/O card, which can control one external 8" hard drive and one to three external 8" floppy drives (these being either single- or double-sided, and either single- or double-density).

The 820-II has a processor expansion capability, which optionally supports a 16-bit Intel 8086 processor card with its own 128 KB or 256 KB of RAM (the 16-bit processor card uses the on-mainboard Z80A for all peripheral I/O operations, therefore the 8086 behaves more like a co-processor).

The 820-II's 16-bit processor card features a true 16-bit 8086 processor, not an 8/16-bit 8088 processor as on the contemporary IBM PC.

The 16-bit processor card is, however, limited to 128 KB of DRAM (256 KB, maximum, if incorporating a rather rare RAM "daughter" card).

Flipping the 820-II's console between 8-bit and 16-bit modes on an 820-II which is equipped with the optional 16-bit processor card is accomplished by a keyboard control command.

Xerox 820-II component parts were available from Xerox outlet stores at quite reasonable prices, and it was not uncommon to convert surplus (but new) 128 KB 16-bit processor cards to 512 KB by the substitution of sixteen 41256 DRAM chips for the card's usual sixteen 4164 DRAM chips (both are 16-pin DIPs—pin 1 is unused on a 4164 and becomes A8 on a 41256), plus the addition of two ICs (one 74F02 and one 74F08, or two user-modified PALs) for controlling the 41256's 9th address row and column (not found on 4164s), thereby achieving a four-times increase in RAM without the use of a "daughter" card (which can only achieve a two-times increase in RAM).

A simple modification to the 820-II's BIOS initialization code was developed to move the BIOS image up to the top of the 512 KB RAM area, thereby giving the applications maximum contiguous RAM. Otherwise, the 512 KB of the converted processor card is segmented into a lower 128 KB segment, and an upper 384 KB segment, but CP/M-86 was designed to handle such segmented RAM, so this BIOS modification is optional, although desirable.

Unlike much later processors from Intel, and others, which offers both segmented and "flat" addressing, the 8086 (and the 8088) offers only segmented addressing, with each segment limited to 64 KB. By effective utilization of the four available segment registers, Code, Data, Stack and Extra, the 512 KB address space possible with the modified 820-II 8086 processor card can be very effectively managed, although in 64 KB chunks. If each data area is identified with its segment and its offset, possibly starting with zero offset, then there is little penalty associated with such segmented addressing, just as long as each individual data area does not exceed 64 KB, and most such data areas were intentionally designed so as not to exceed 64 KB.

=== Disk storage ===
Much CP/M software uses the Xerox 820's disk format, and other computers such as the Kaypro II are compatible with it. The CRT unit contains the processor, and a large port on the back connected via heavy cable to a disk drive, allowing a wide variety of configurations. Disk drives can be daisy-chained via a port on the back.

| Component | Capacity | Tracks/disk | Sectors/track | Bytes/sector | Notes |
|---|---|---|---|---|---|
| Dual 5.25" single-sided floppy drives | 81K usable single density, 155K double density | 40 | 18 or 17 | 128 or 256 | All floppy disks are soft-sectored |
| Dual 5.25" double-sided floppy drives | 172K usable SD, 322K DD | 80 | 18 or 17 | 128 or 256 | |
| Dual 8" single-sided floppy drives | 241K usable SD, 482K DD | 77 | 26 | 128 or 256 | |
| Dual 8" double-sided floppy drives | 490K usable SD, 980K DD | 154 | 26 | 128 or 256 | |
| 8" rigid disk drive | 8.19MB | 1024 | 32 | 256 | Provided with one 8" double-sided floppy drive, which was expandable to three such floppy drives |

Reference: 820-II Operation Manual

=== The Basic Operating System (BOS) monitor ===
The system can function to a limited extent without having to load a disk operating system: the system monitor in ROM allows, at boot-up, a variety of uses via one-letter commands followed by attributes.

A user normally uses the "(L)oad" command to load a bootstrap loader (i.e., for CP/M) from a floppy or the fixed disk. One can also access a "(T)ypewriter" mode for direct interface with the serial printer port and basic typing on screen. "(H)ost terminal" allows the 820-II to interface as a terminal via either of the serial ports, as specified, at up to 19.2 kbit/s.

For low-end system operations, a user can manually read or write to memory, execute code at a particular location in memory, read from or write to the system ports, or even read a sector from a disk. Further, (documented) calls to BOS subroutines allows a skilled user or program to restart the system, perform disk operations, take keyboard input, or write to the display.

Reference: 820-II Reference Guide

== Model 16/8 ==
The Model 16/8, introduced in May 1983, has dual CPUs, an 8-bit Z80 and 16-bit Intel 8086, which can be booted jointly or separately. The operating system is 8-bit CP/M-80 and 16-bit CP/M-86, and the computer was supplied with the WordStar word processor and dBase II database management system. It has double 8" floppy disk drives, a 12" monochrome monitor and a daisywheel printer. Later in 1984 double 5.25" floppy disk drives, a portrait-size blue monitor, and a laser printer were offered. The Model 16/8 is also called a Xerox 823.

Flipping the 8/16's console between 8 bit and 16 bit modes is accomplished by a simple keyboard control command.

== Reception ==
The 820 was codenamed The Worm because Xerox saw Apple Computer as its main competitor; InfoWorld reported that Apple delayed and redesigned the Apple IIe/'Diana' to better compete with the 820. While less expensive than dedicated word processors such as the Xerox 860, the 820 was expensive and slow compared to personal computers; one month after its release, the $1,795 Osborne 1—faster, portable, and with bundled software worth more than $1,000—appeared, while Xerox charged $200 for the required CP/M software. The 820 did not use Xerox PARC's sophisticated technology that influenced the Apple Macintosh.

InfoWorld in 1982 stated that "The considerable virtues of the Xerox 820 lie mostly in its use of the Big Board design—its faults are, to a large extent, Xerox's own, and in no small measure due to its rush to get the system to market" before the IBM PC. The reviewer criticized the keyboard's contact bounce, slow disk access, and "pieced-together ... minimal" documentation, and warned customers against the Xerox-customized WordStar. He reported that three of the four computers' disk-drive units his company had purchased had problems, and "strongly recommend an 820 owner get a service contract". The reviewer concluded that while the 820 "could be a fine office computer, its faults are so egregious that they indicate a basic lack of attention to detail on the part of Xerox". While noting the 8" model's low price and Xerox's strong field service and "prestige nameplate", and expressing hope that the company "gets it act together" and fix the keyboard and other problems, he suggested that potential customers consider building a similar computer at a lower price around the Big Board.

Xerox was the second Fortune 500 company after Tandy Corporation, and first major American office-technology company, to sell a personal computer. It had experience with large customers, unlike Apple or Tandy. InfoWorld's reviewer stated that he and his colleagues were glad when Xerox announced the 820, because "at last a recognized business-equipment manufacturer had brought out a standard CP/M" computer at a low price; dealers reportedly were also pleased to sell a computer from a well-known company. The Rosen Electronics Letter also unfavorably reviewed the 820 in June 1981, however, describing it as a disappointing, "me too" product for a leading technology company like Xerox. In November it stated that the new IBM PC was much more attractive; "we think the bulk of the sales will go to IBM". They did choose the PC, introduced one month after the 820; Yankee Group said after the latter's discontinuation that it "sort of got blown away right then and there by the IBM announcement". Xerox hoped to sell 100,000 820s in two years, but reportedly failed to do so in four; Micro Cornucopia reported in October 1983 that a dealer had thousands of 820 motherboards for sale for $39.95. Xerox discontinued the 16/8 and 820-II in early 1985; InfoWorld's article stated that "few will notice [their] demise". Yankee Group predicted that the company would introduce its own PC clone.
