= Kaypro =

American computer manufacturer of the 1980s

Kaypro Corporation
- Type: Corporation
- Industry: Computer hardware
- Founded: 1981
- Defunct: 1992
- Headquarters: Solana Beach, California
- Key people: Andrew Kay
- Products: Computers

Kaypro Corporation was an American home and personal computer manufacturer based in Solana Beach, California, in the 1980s. The company was founded by Non-Linear Systems (NLS) to compete with the popular Osborne 1 portable microcomputer. Kaypro produced a line of rugged, luggable CP/M-based computers sold with an extensive software bundle which supplanted its competitors and quickly became one of the top-selling personal computer lines of the early 1980s.

Kaypro was exceptionally loyal to its original customer base but slow to adapt to the changing computer market and the advent of IBM PC compatible technology. It faded from the mainstream before the end of the decade and was eventually forced into bankruptcy in 1992.

== History ==
Kaypro began as Non-Linear Systems (NLS), a maker of electronic test equipment, founded in 1952 by Andrew Kay, the inventor of the digital voltmeter.

In the 1970s, NLS was an early adopter of microprocessor technology, which enhanced the flexibility of products such as production-line test sets. In 1981, Non-Linear Systems began designing a personal computer, called KayComp, that would compete with the popular Osborne 1 luggable microcomputer. In 1982, Non-Linear Systems organized Kaypro Corporation as a daughter company. The company stated at the April 1982 West Coast Computer Faire that it had 20 dealers, would not use its existing test-equipment distributors, received $50,000 in orders every day, and expected to start shipping the computer on 20 May.

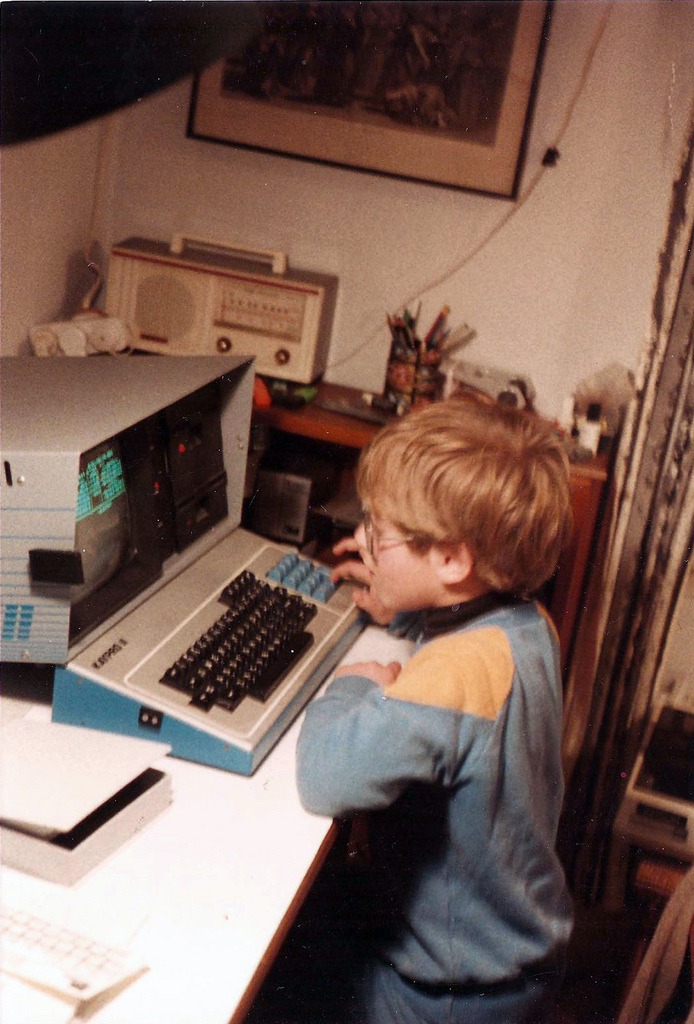
Boy with Kaypro II, 1984

The first Kaypro model to be released commercially was branded as the Kaypro II; at the time, one of the most popular microcomputers was the Apple II. The Kaypro II was designed to be portable like the Osborne, contained in a single enclosure with a handle for carrying. (Note: The term "portable" also implies that the weight of the machine was low enough that a typical adult was capable of lifting it. In the early 1980s, the alternative to a "portable" computer was a computer designed to be installed at a fixed location: such a machine was typically impractical to transport without some disassembly and was difficult or impossible for a single person to carry out of a room, let alone to another building, in a single trip. The Kaypro II (like the Osborne 1, the later Compaq Portable, and the original Apple Macintosh) was portable in the way a portable typewriter—one of the machines that personal computers replaced—was portable, and should not be confused with the meaning of the modern term 'mobile' (e.g. 'mobile phone', or "mobile computing with a notebook PC"). The standard Kaypro II (like the other three portable machines mentioned) was powered by AC line current only; it was meant to be moved from one building to another—e.g. from one's home to one's office or a friend's home—to be quickly set up and used on a desk or tabletop there.) Set in an aluminum case, with a keyboard that snapped onto the front, covering the 9" CRT display and drives, it weighed 29 pounds (13 kg) and was equipped with a Zilog Z80 microprocessor, 64 kilobytes of RAM, and two 5¼-inch double-density single-sided floppy disk drives. It ran Digital Research, Inc.'s CP/M operating system, the industry standard for 8-bit computers with 8080 or Z80 CPUs, and sold for about US$1,795 (equivalent to $6,000 in 2025).

The company advertised the Kaypro II as "the $1,595 computer that sells for $1,595". Although some of the press mocked its design—one magazine described Kaypro as "producing computers packaged in tin cans"—others raved about its value, noting that the included software bundle had a retail value over $1,000 by itself, and by mid-1983 the company was selling more than 10,000 units a month, briefly making it the fifth-largest computer maker in the world.

The Kaypro II was part of a new generation of consumer-friendly personal computers that were designed to appeal to novice users who wanted to perform basic productivity on a machine that was relatively easy to set up and use. It managed to correct most of the Osborne 1's deficiencies: the screen was larger and showed more characters at once, the floppy drives stored over twice as much data, and it was better-built and more reliable.

Computers such as the Kaypro II were widely referred to as "appliance" or "turnkey" machines; they offered little in the way of expandability or features that would interest hackers or electronics hobbyists and were mainly characterized by their affordable price and a collection of bundled software. While it was easy to obtain and use new software with the Kaypro II—there were thousands of application programs available for CP/M, and every Kaypro 8-bit computer had a full 64 KB of RAM, enough to run virtually any CP/M program—the hardware expandability of this computer was nearly nonexistent. The Kaypro II had no expansion slots or system bus connector, no spare ROM socket, no peripheral bus, only two I/O ports, (Note: One minimal Centronics-type printer port and one RS-232 serial port with a baud rate up to 19200, though the CPU might not have been able to sustain that serial data rate.) and an ASCII text-only green-on-black video display, of 80 x 24 characters, that could only be shown on the internal 9" CRT monitor (despite the video being scanned at NTSC TV-compatible rates).

In contrast, one feature that was favorable to electronics hobbyists was that all the chips on the Kaypro II mainboard were installed in sockets, not soldered to the board, making it easy to repair the machines or even to splice custom circuits into the stock logic (temporarily or permanently). Also, while Kaypro machines were generally not upgradeable without factory-unauthorized custom modification, some Kaypro computers that came with single-sided floppy disk drives could be upgraded to double-sided drives, and some that came with only one floppy drive could have a second drive added. (The Kaypro II itself was upgradeable, or not, to double-sided drives depending on which of two possible mainboard types was installed in the machine). (Note: Some Kaypro II units—probably the earliest ones—have the 81-110 mainboard, which lacks the connection of the side-select signal and so can only control single-sided drives. Other Kaypro II units have the 81-240 mainboard: this is the same board used in the Kaypro 4, so it has that signal connected and can support double-sided drives. However, the Kaypro II and Kaypro 4, which have no equipment differences other than the installed floppy disk drives, also had different monitor ROM versions (as of Sept. 1985), so it might be necessary to replace that ROM at the same time double-sided drives are installed in the Kaypro II, effectively completing its conversion to a Kaypro 4 (except for the exterior finish). In the 1980s, the Kaypro 4 ROM could have been bought from Kaypro. In the 21st century, 8-bit Kaypro ROM images can be found on the web, but a vintage original Kaypro II might retain more value if kept in the original stock condition. Fortunately, all modifications discussed here are fully reversible, provided the original ROM is kept and stored appropriately to protect it.)

Despite their limitations, the boxy units were so popular that they spawned a network of hobbyist user groups across the United States that provided local support for Kaypro products; the company worked with the user groups and would have a salesman drop by if in the area.

Kaypro's success contributed to the eventual failure of the Osborne Computer Corporation and Morrow Designs. A more rugged seeming, "industrialized" design than competitors such as the Osborne made the Kaypro popular for commercial/industrial applications. Its RS-232 port was widely used by service technicians for on-site equipment configuration, control and diagnostics. The relatively high quality of mechanical fabrication seen in the aluminum-cased Kaypro 8-bit computers was a natural outgrowth of NLS's prior business building professional and industrial electronic test instruments.

The version of CP/M included with the Kaypro could also read the Xerox 810's single-sided, single-density 86k floppy format. The Kaypro 8-bit computers used the popular Western Digital FD1793 floppy disk controller; the Kaypro II, 4, 10, and similar models were capable of reading and/or writing any disk format that the FD1793 could read and/or write (at 250 kbit/s). Theoretically, any soft-sector MFM or FM floppy format that is within the limits of the FD1793 (Note: E.g. sector data sizes of only 128, 256, 512, or 1024 bytes, certain minimum gap lengths, and other constraints as described in the Western Digital FD197X datasheet.) could be read or written if the user wrote their own utility program.

Kaypro published and subsidized ProFiles: The Magazine for Kaypro Users, a monthly, 72-page, four-color magazine that went beyond coverage of Kaypro's products to include substantive information on CP/M and MS-DOS; frequent contributors included Ted Chiang, David Gerrold, Robert J. Sawyer, and Ted Silveira. Keeping its namesake, the publication profiled Kaypro founder Andrew Kay and software engineer Stephen Buccaci.

Another popular magazine that covered Kaypro computers was Micro Cornucopia, published in Bend, Oregon.

Arthur C. Clarke used a Kaypro II to write and collaboratively edit (via modem from Sri Lanka) his 1982 novel 2010: Odyssey Two and the later film adaptation. A book, The Odyssey File - The Making of 2010, was later released about the collaboration.

Following the success of the Kaypro II, Kaypro moved on to produce a long line of similar computers into the mid-1980s. Exceedingly loyal to its original core group of customers, Kaypro continued using the CP/M operating system long after it had been abandoned by its competitors.

In late 1984, Kaypro introduced its first IBM PC compatible, the Kaypro 16 transportable. While admitting that "it's what our dealers asked for", the company stated that it would continue to produce its older computers. This was followed by other PC compatibles: the Kaypro PC, Kaypro 286i (the first 286 IBM PC AT compatible), the Kaypro 386, and the Kaypro 2000 (a rugged aluminum-body battery-powered laptop with a detachable keyboard). The slow start into the IBM clone market would have serious ramifications for the company.

After several turbulent years, with sales dwindling, Kaypro filed for Chapter 11 bankruptcy in March 1990. Despite restructuring, the company was unable to recover and filed for Chapter 7 bankruptcy in June 1992. In 1995, its remaining assets were sold for US$2.7 million.

The Kaypro name briefly re-emerged as an online vendor of Microsoft Windows PCs in 1999, but was discontinued in 2001 by its parent company Premio Inc. because of sluggish sales.

== Kaypro computers ==
=== Hardware ===
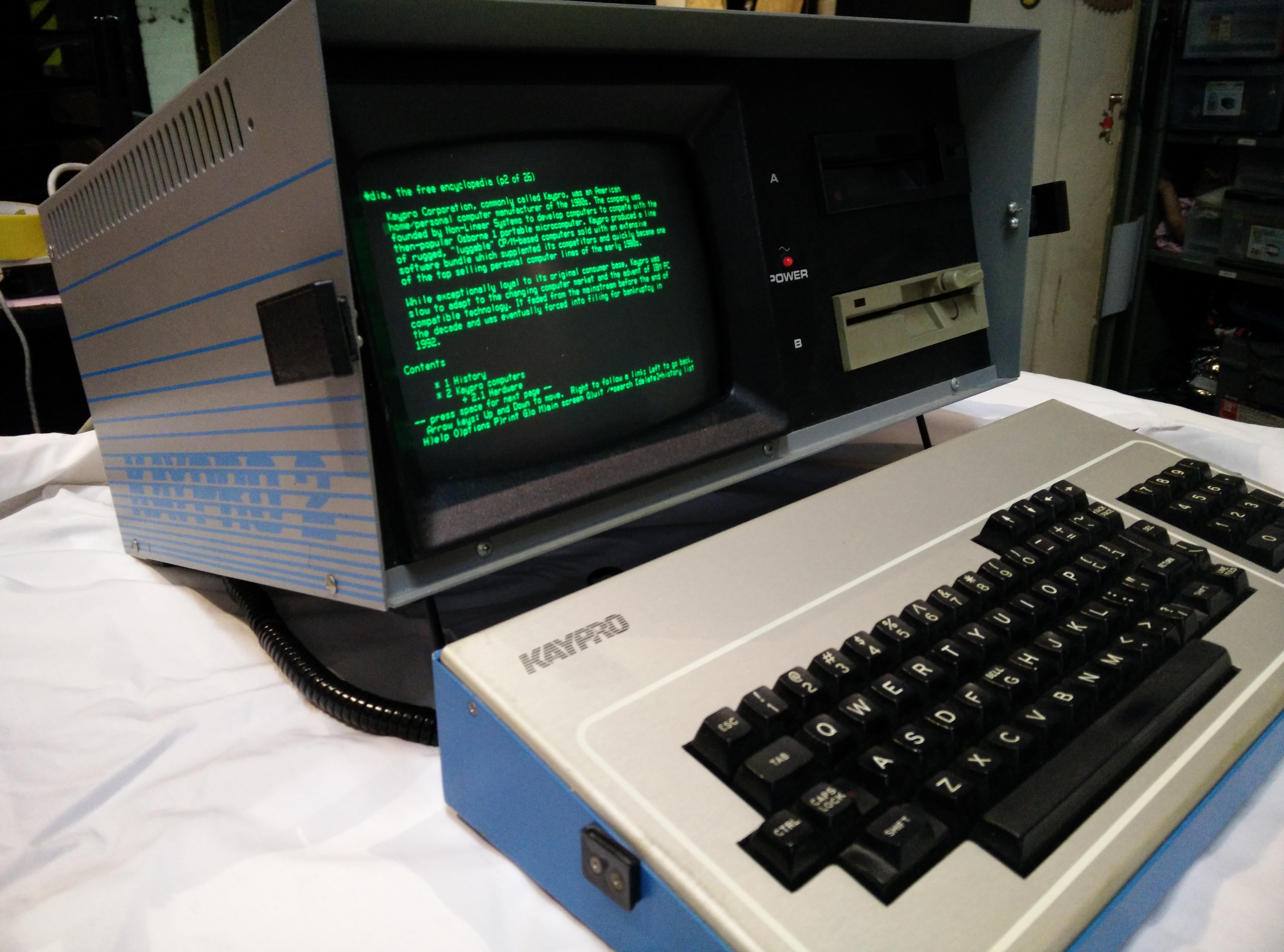
A Kaypro II displaying the Kaypro Wikipedia page using Lynx over a serial connection

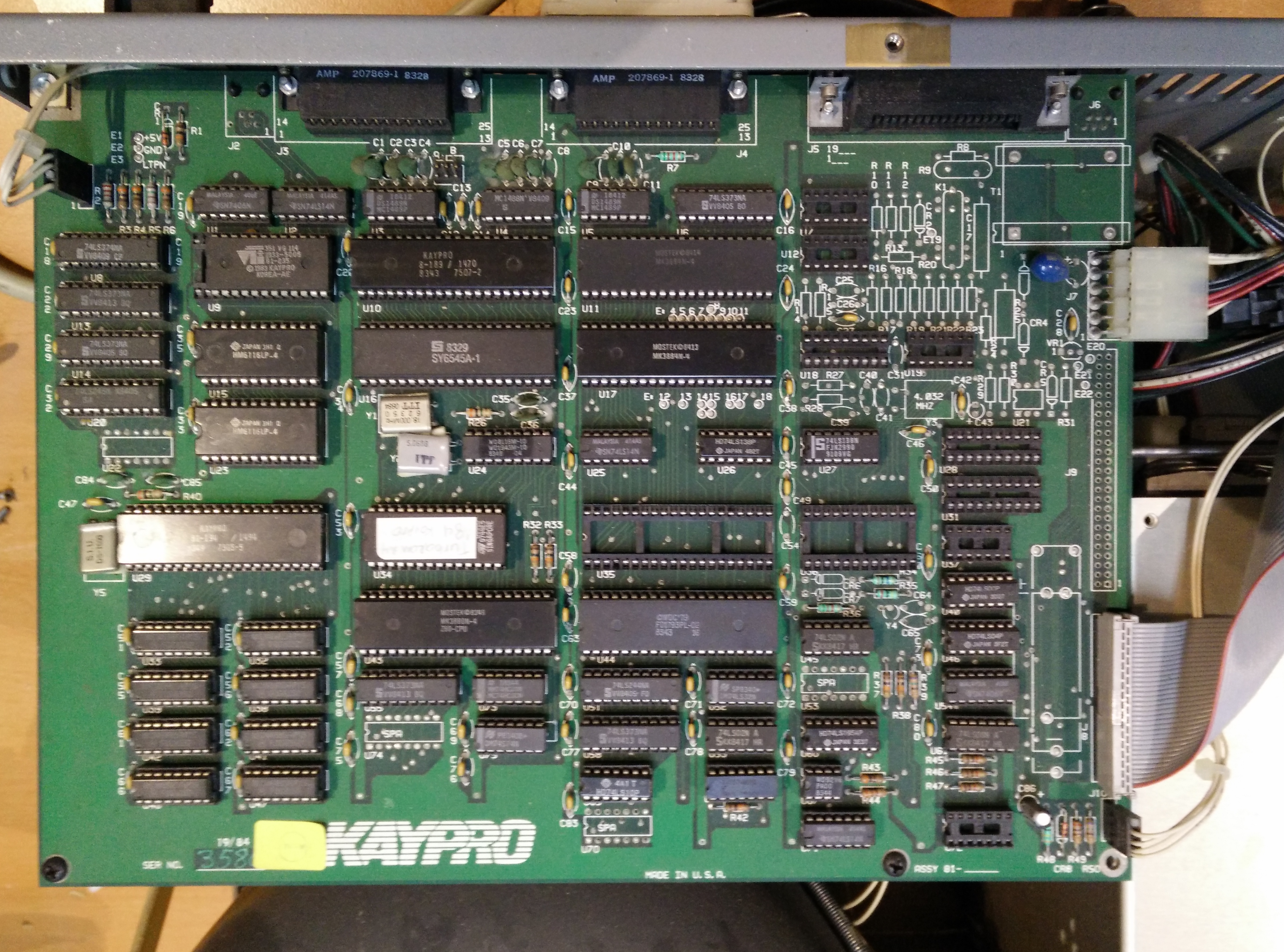
A Kaypro II motherboard

The Kaypro II has a 2.5 MHz Zilog Z80 microprocessor; 64 KB of RAM; two single-sided 191 KB 5¼-inch floppy disk drives (named A: and B:); and an 80-column, green monochrome, 9" CRT that was praised for its size and clarity (in comparison, the Osborne 1 had a 5" display).

Early in the Kaypro's life, there was a legal dispute with the owner of the Big Board computer, who charged that the Kaypro II main circuit board was an unlicensed copy or clone.

The outer case is constructed of painted aluminum. The computer features a large detachable keyboard unit that covers the screen and disk drives when stowed. The computer could fit into an airline overhead rack. This and other Kaypro computers (except for the Kaypro 2000) run off regular AC mains power and are not equipped with a battery. The Kaypro II was a usable and (at the time) powerful computer for home or office, even though the painted metal case made it look more like a rugged laboratory instrument than an office machine. It enjoyed a reputation for durability.

The Kaypro IV and later the Kaypro 4 have two double-sided disks. The Kaypro 4 was released in 1984, and was usually referred to as Kaypro 4 '84, as opposed to the Kaypro IV, released one year earlier and referred to as Kaypro IV '83. The Kaypro IV uses different screen addresses than the Kaypro II, meaning software has to be specific to the model.

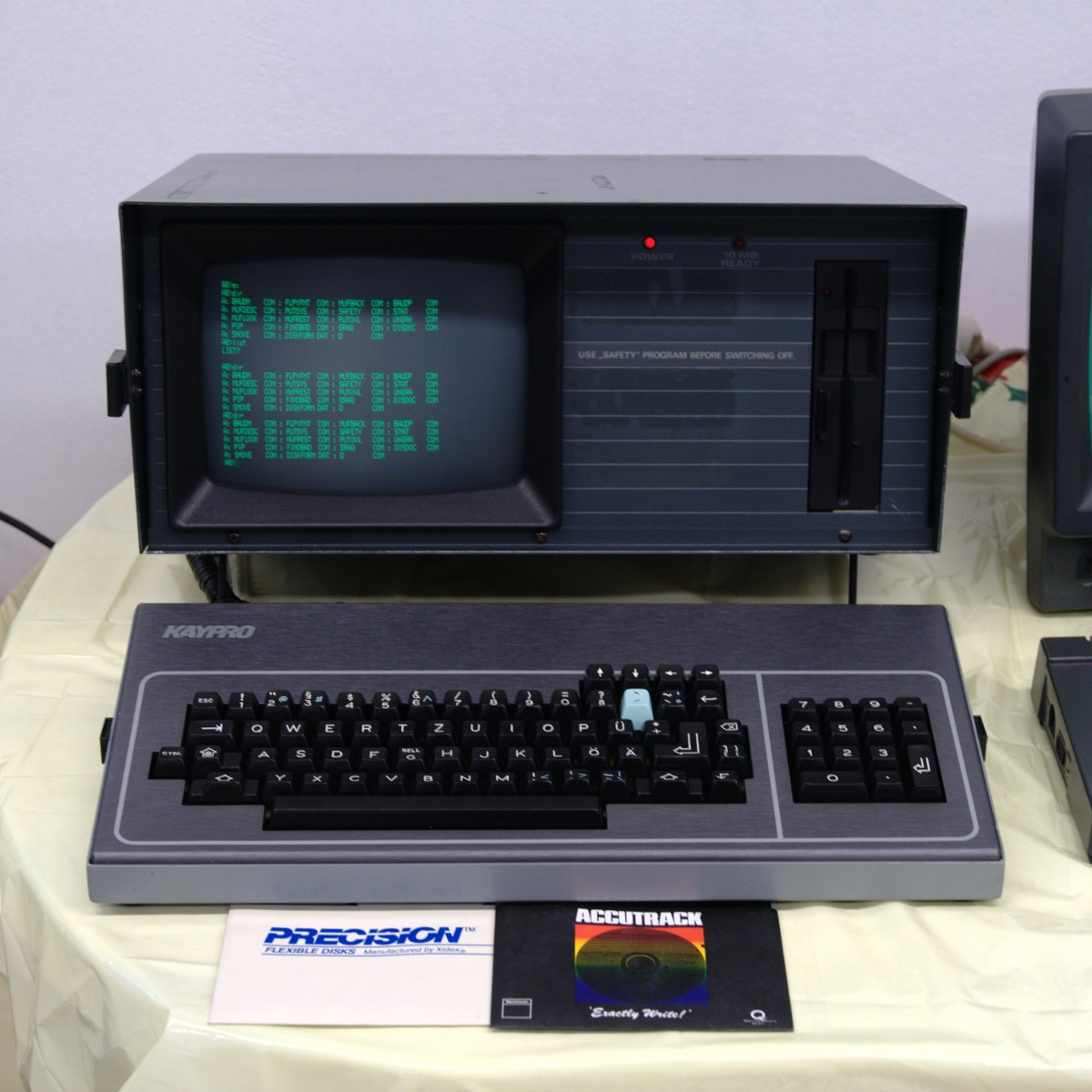
A Kaypro 10 portable computer

The Kaypro 10 followed the Kaypro II, and is much like the Kaypro II and Kaypro 4, with the addition of a 10 megabyte hard drive (dually partitioned A: and B:) and replacing one of the two floppy drives (the remaining drive being addressed as C:). The Kaypro 10 also eliminated the complicated procedures to turn the computer on and off often associated with hard disk technology.

Kaypro later replaced its CP/M machines with the MS-DOS-based Kaypro 16, Kaypro PC and others, as the IBM PC and its clones gained popularity. Kaypro was late to the market, however, and never gained the kind of prominence in the MS-DOS arena that it had enjoyed with CP/M. Instead, Kaypro watched as a new company—Compaq—grabbed its market with the Compaq Portable, an all-in-one portable computer that was similar to Kaypro's own CP/M portables with the exception of running MS-DOS with near 100% IBM PC compatibility. The Compaq was larger and less durable—whereas the Kaypro had a heavy-gauge aluminium case, the Compaq case was plastic, with a thin-gauge aluminum inner shield to reduce radio frequency interference—but rapidly took over the portable PC market segment.

The 1985 introductions of the Kaypro 286i, the first IBM PC AT clone, and the Kaypro 2000, one of the first laptop computers (an MS-DOS system with monochrome LCD and durable aluminum case), did little to change Kaypro's fortunes. Kaypro's failure in the MS-DOS market and other corporate issues helped lead to the company's eventual downfall.

=== Software ===
CP/M was the standard operating system for the first generation of Kaypros. The first application software that came with the Kaypro II included a highly unpopular word processor called Select that was quickly dropped in favor of a proto office suite from Perfect Software which included Perfect Writer, Perfect Calc, Perfect Filer, and Perfect Speller, as well as Kaypro's own S-BASIC compiler (which produced executable .com files). Perfect Filer featured non-relational, flat-file databases suitable for merging a contact list with form letters created in Perfect Writer.

Perfect Writer was initially a rebranded version of the MINCE and Scribble software packages from Mark of the Unicorn, which are CP/M implementations of Emacs and Scribe, ported from their original minicomputer-based versions using BDS C. Later, MBasic (a variant of Microsoft BASIC) and The Word Plus spellchecker were added to the model II suite of software. Word Plus included a set of utilities that could help solve crossword puzzles or anagrams, insert soft hyphens, alphabetize word lists, and compute word frequencies. Another utility program called Uniform allowed the Kaypro to read disks formatted by Osborne, Xerox, or TRS-80 computers.

The initial bundled applications were soon replaced by the well-known titles WordStar, a word processor, with MailMerge, originally a third-party accessory, for personalised mass mailings (form letters), the SuperCalc spreadsheet, two versions of the Microsoft BASIC interpreter, Kaypro's S-BASIC, a bytecode-compiled BASIC called C-Basic, and the dBase II relational database system.

Data could be moved between these programs relatively easily by using comma-delimited format files (now more commonly known as CSV files), which enhanced the utility of the package. The manuals assumed no computer background, the programs were straightforward to use, and thus it was possible to find the CEO of a small company developing the applications needed in-house.

The Kaypro II and later models also came with some games, including versions of old character-based games such as Star Trek; a few were arcade games re-imagined in ASCII, including CatChum (a Pac-Man-like game), Aliens (a Space Invaders-like game) and Ladder (a Donkey Kong-like game). If bought separately, this software would have cost more than the entire hardware and software package together.

Later Kaypro CP/M models came with even more software. In 1984, BYTE magazine observed "Kaypro apparently has tremendous buying and bargaining power," noting the Kaypro 10 came with both WordStar and Perfect Writer, plus "two spelling checkers, two spreadsheets, two communications programs and three versions of BASIC".

The Kaypro emulated the ADM-3A terminal and could also be used as a general purpose terminal itself. Most CP/M-80 software not explicitly supplied for the Kaypro but supporting the common ADM-3A terminal emulation would easily be transferred to run on it.

Later MS-DOS Kaypro computers offered a similar software bundle.

== Reception ==
InfoWorld in 1982 described Kaypro II as "a rugged, functional and practical computer system marketed at a reasonable price." The reviewer called the hardware "first-rate", writing that he had used the computer indoors and outdoors in several countries without fault, and praising the keyboard and screen. Deficiencies included the heavy weight and mediocre documentation.

Jerry Pournelle wrote in BYTE in 1983 that he was able to use a Kaypro II without the documentation. Although he preferred the much more expensive Otrona Attaché (another CP/M machine), Pournelle called the Kaypro's hardware "impressive" and "rugged", approving of the keyboard layout and "certainly the largest screen you'll ever get in a portable machine." A later review by the magazine described the computer as "best value", citing the rugged hardware design, sharp display, keyboard, documentation, and the extensive bundled software. In 1984 Pournelle stated that "For those without much money, there's no real choice ... you need a Kaypro, which has become both the VW and Chevrolet of the micro industry ... rugged, reliable, and not very pretty".

BYTE stated in 1984 that while the Kaypro 10 was "not a technologically innovative machine ... the equipment and power delivered for the price are outstanding", noting that the $2,795 computer "costs less than many stand-alone hard-disk drives". It approved of the "beautiful" monitor as an improvement from the Kaypro II's, and the extensive menus for running software on the hard drive without using the command line. The magazine criticized the "unacceptable" user's guide, and predicted that the large software bundle would be "stupefying" to novice users, but concluded that the computer was an "exceptional value for the money. It should be considered by anyone interested in hard-disk capacity or performance at an excellent price."

Creative Computing in December 1984 chose the Kaypro II as the best transportable computer under $2,500, praising the "incredible array of software" included for "an astounding $1,295" price.

The Chicago Tribune in March 1986 praised the Kaypro PC and Leading Edge Model D as "the two best computer buys today", citing the former's bundled software, six slots, ease of repair, and silent keyboard.

== Kaypro by model and year ==
Kaypro's nomenclature was odd, with the numerical designations for its machines having more to do with the capacity of the drives than the order they were produced. Kaypro also released several different models with the same names, perhaps hoping to capitalize on the name recognition of its older machines. As a result, identifying exactly which model a Kaypro is often requires an inspection of its hardware configuration.

All of the computers listed below are of the portable type unless otherwise noted.

- 1982
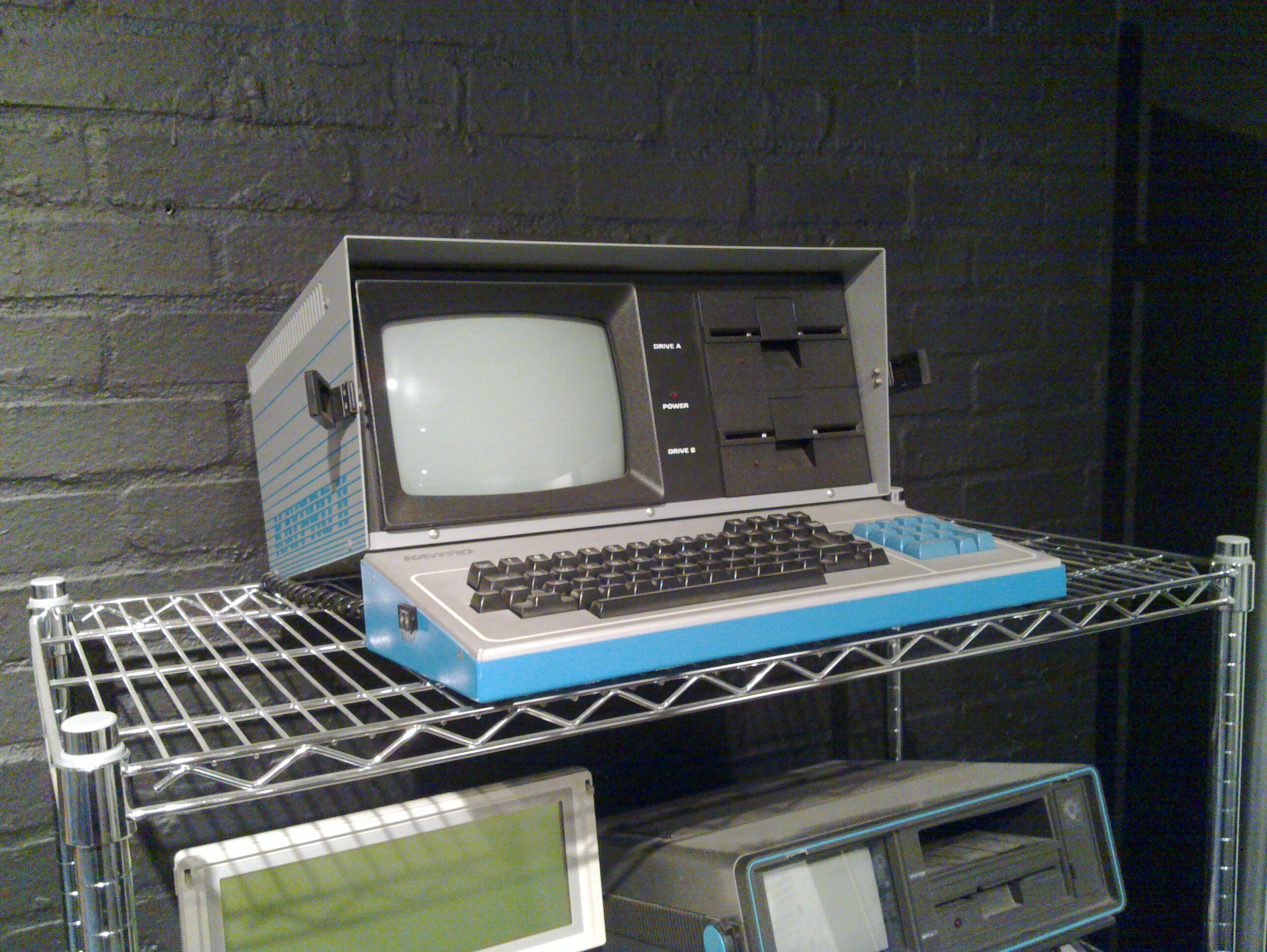
  - Kaypro II
    Kaycomp II (prototype): The first Kaypro was a demonstrator model shown mainly to prospective dealers. It had the same case as future models, but was painted green, with two single sided floppy drives that were mounted vertically on opposite sides of the monitor like the Osborne 1, its intended competition, and a 9-inch internal monitor instead of the Osborne's 5-inch display. A computer virtually identical to the later Kaypro II but labeled "Kaycomp" on the side was sold to the public in limited numbers. This version had two vertically mounted drives on the right and a Keytronic keyboard with all-black keys rather than the blue numeric keypad.
  - Kaypro II: The first commercially released Kaypro was an immediate success, dominating its competition, the Osborne 1 microcomputer. Originally marketed as Kaycomp II, it featured two single sided floppy disk drives mounted horizontally to the right of the 9" monochrome green CRT screen, which provided an 80x24 character ASCII display. The Z80 CPU ran at 2.5 MHz.
- 1983
  - Kaypro IV: An evolution of the Kaypro II, the Kaypro IV had two DS/DD drives (390 KB) and came with WordStar in addition to the Perfect Suite of software.
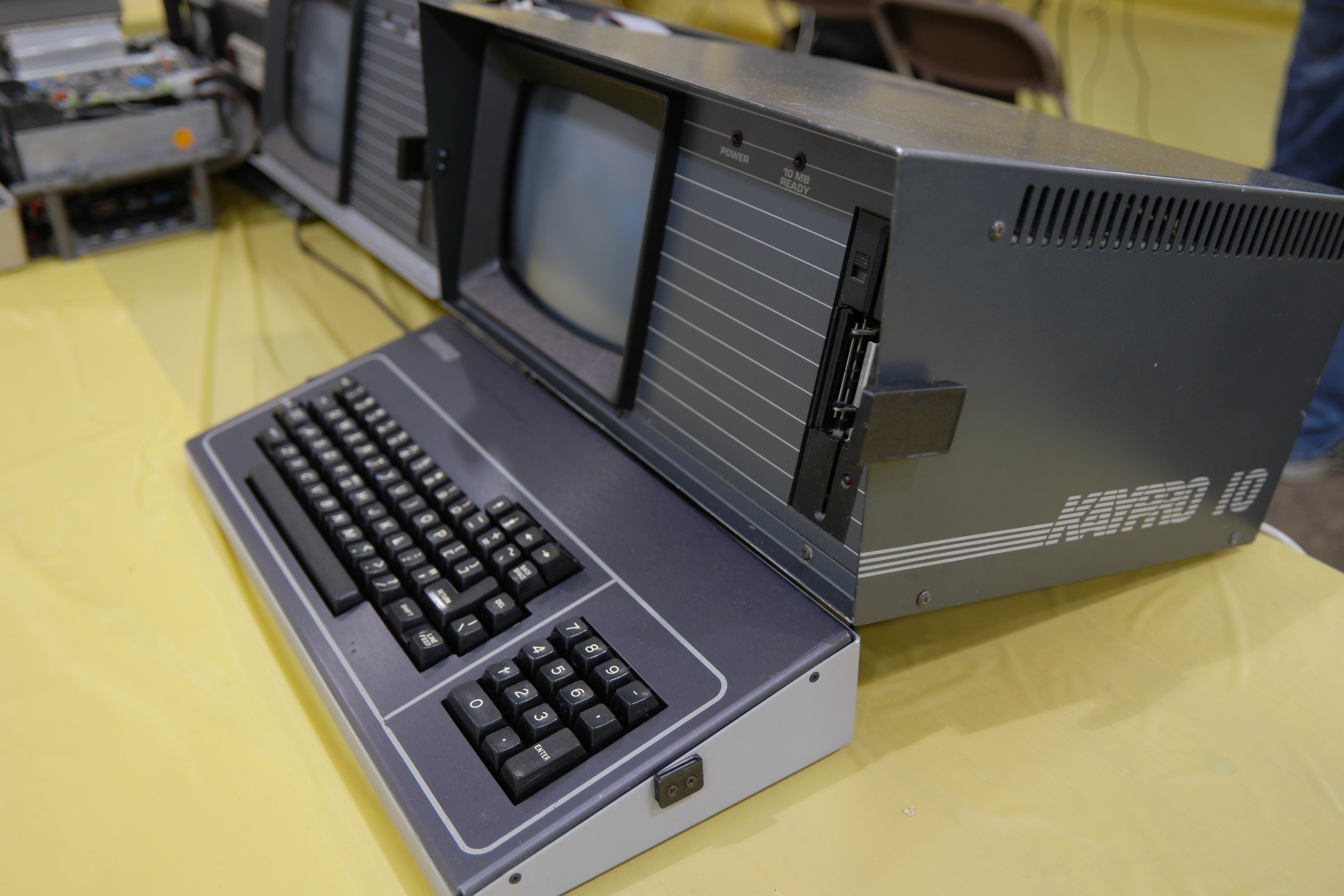
  - Kaypro 10
    Kaypro 10: The Kaypro 10 was one of the earliest computers to come standard with a hard drive. It came with a 10-megabyte internal hard drive and a single DS/DD floppy drive.
- 1984
  - Kaypro 4: The Kaypro 4 was virtually identical to the IV, but featured half-height drives instead of full-height drives, a 4 MHz clock speed and had basic graphics capabilities. It also had an internal 300-baud modem.
  - Kaypro 2X: The Kaypro 2X was similar to the Kaypro 4, but it lacked the built-in 300-baud modem that was available in the Kaypro 4. Kaypro 2X's were often sold in a bundle with the WordStar word processing software suite, spreadsheet and database software. The impact printer that was also included in the bundle was labeled as the "Kaypro Printer", but was actually a re-branded Juki 6100 daisywheel printer.
  - Kaypro Robie: The Kaypro Robie was the only CP/M based Kaypro to be non-portable. Designed as a desktop computer, it had the same motherboard as the Kaypro 4. It was also equipped with two 2.6 MB high-density floppy drives and a 300-baud modem. The floppy drives were notorious for destroying disks as they literally scraped the media off of the disk substrate. The Robie was jet black, with the drives mounted above the screen, and the front panel angled upward. The Robie did not sell well, but it did make periodic cameo appearances on the ABC television series Moonlighting, as the desktop computer used by Bruce Willis's character David Addison. Due to its black color, the fact that it sat upright and looked like a helmet, and its handle mounted on the top, it was nicknamed "Darth Vader's lunchbox".
- 1985
  - Kaypro "New" 2: A scaled-down Kaypro 2X for the budget buyer, came with minimal software. It featured single sided double density drives instead of the 2X's double sided drives and did not feature the internal modem.
  - Kaypro 4+88: A dual system computer, the 4+88 was equipped with both an 8088 processor and a Z80, and was capable of running both the MS-DOS and CP/M operating systems. It came with 256 KB of RAM for the MS-DOS operating system that could double as a RAM disk for CP/M.
  - Kaypro 16: Similar in appearance to the Kaypro 10, the Kaypro 16's main difference was that it had an 8088 processor and 256 KB of RAM and ran on the MS-DOS operating system instead of CP/M. The Kaypro 16/2e was a "Bundle" for a college computer. It came with DOS 3.3, two 5.25" 360 KB floppy drives and 768 KB RAM and bundled software, including the WordStar word processor.
  - Kaypro 2000: Kaypro's first and only laptop, it was an MS-DOS machine that ran on heavy lead-acid batteries—the same battery technology used in automobile batteries. Similar in basic appearance to a modern laptop, it featured a detachable keyboard, rugged brushed aluminum casing and a pop-up 3.5-inch floppy drive. In what seems to have been a recurring comparison, it has been called "Darth Vader's laptop".
  - Kaypro PC: Late to the PC market, the Kaypro PC was intended as a competitor to the IBM PC-XT desktop machine. Running at a faster clock speed than IBM's machine, it was available with a larger hard drive than that offered by IBM and an extensive software package. It featured the CPU on a daughterboard on a backplane, which, like the Zenith Data Systems' Z-DOS machines, promised upgradability.
  - Kaypro 286i: A 6 MHz 286 desktop, it was the first IBM PC/AT compatible, with dual 1.2 MB floppy drives standard and an extensive software package but no MS-DOS 3.0, which had not yet been released, requiring the user to purchase PC DOS 3.0 from IBM.
- 1986
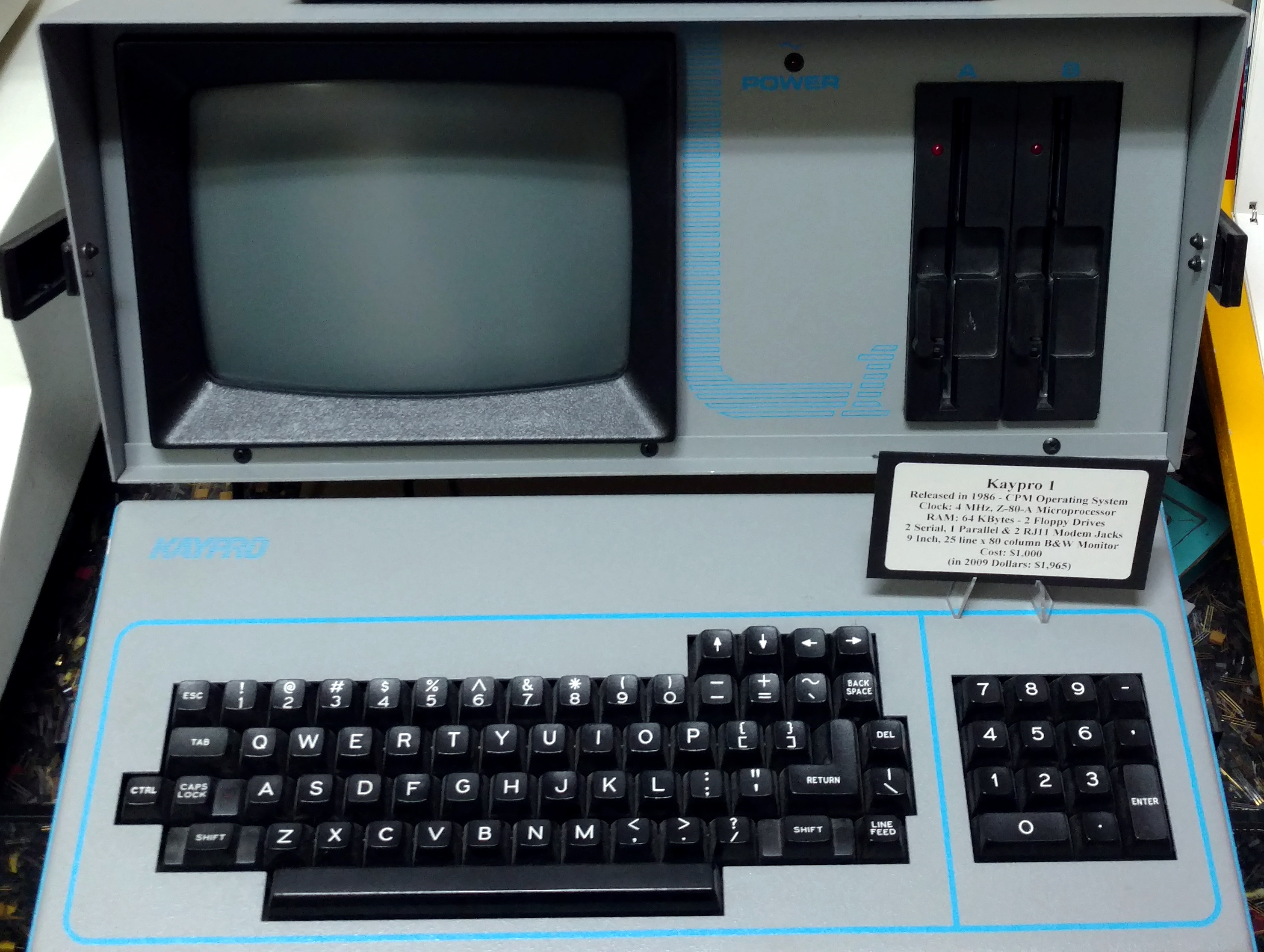
  - Kaypro 1
    Kaypro 1: The Kaypro 1 was the last CP/M model Kaypro introduced. In most ways, it was simply a Kaypro 2X with a smaller software package. It is distinctive from earlier Kaypro models because of its vertically oriented disk drives (although some Kaypro 10 models also had them).
- 1987
  - Kaypro 386: A 20 MHz 386 desktop, with an extensive software package. It featured a CPU on a circuit board that fit onto a backplane, just like the other expansion cards.
