= SCML =

SCML can refer to: SCML may refer to:

- Scribe (markup language)
- Structural Character Modeling Language, a Chinese character description language proposal
- Santa Casa da Misericórdia de Lisboa (Portugal)
- Safe Consumer Markup Language, a structured business language to enhance communications between suppliers and retailers during food crises
