= Bundling (public choice) =

Concept used for studying the selection of candidates for public office

Bundling is a concept used for studying the selection of candidates for public office. A voter typically chooses a candidate (or party) for the legislature, rather than directly voting for specific policies. When doing so, the voter is essentially selecting among bundles of policies that a candidate or a party will enact if in power.

== Overview ==
Occurring principally in republics, the electorate, rather than directly voting on each individual piece of proposed legislation, must choose a number of candidates (or parties) for the legislature. In so doing, they accept or reject each individual candidate or party and their "bundle" of positions on various issues. As there may be no candidate who perfectly reflects the views of an individual voter on all the issues of importance to him/her, each voter must prioritize what issues are most important and choose a candidate accordingly. Another form of bundling occurs in races where the candidate has a running mate who is elected on the same ticket, as in U.S. presidential elections.

Bundling, as studied in public choice theory is essentially a variant of product bundling: each candidate and party is marketed as a product comprising a bundle of positions and attributes. In party-list proportional representation (particularly closed list variants), bundling may be especially pronounced, as voters select an entire slate of party candidates rather than choosing individual candidates, thus lacking the option of selecting one candidate of a party and not another. Robert Cooter's The Strategic Constitution notes that when voters' demand for a party is inelastic, the party will tend to nominate candidates based more on loyalty than on popularity: "Thus, monopoly power of a party decreases the demand of its leaders for loyalty."

Bundling in political economy is not to be confused with bundling of donations in campaign finance. It has been argued that bundling can often reduce the cost of political transactions. But it has also been argued that the bundling of policy packages necessitated by indivisibility weakens the signals provided even by well-informed voters.

== See also ==
- Autonomism
- Corporative federalism
- Consociationalism
- Multicameralism
- Pillarisation
- Voluntary association
