= Otrona =

US computer manufacturer

Otrona Advanced Systems Corporation
- Company type: Private
- Industry: Computers
- Founded: c. 1981; 44 years ago in Boulder, Colorado, United States
- Defunct: September 1984
- Fate: Bankruptcy liquidation
- Number of employees: 175 (1984)

Otrona Advanced Systems Corporation was an early Colorado manufacturer of business portable CP/M and MS-DOS compatible computers.

== Otrona Attaché and 8:16 ==
The American company's first major product, the Otrona Attaché, came out in April 1982 and folded up to the size of a fat briefcase painted off-white with orange trim. When set up for use, the carrying handle swung under the chassis to prop it up for easier viewing. A keyboard could be removed from one end, revealing a small 5-inch monochrome CRT and two 360Kb "half-height" 5.25 inch floppy disk drives.

The system featured a Zilog Z80A microprocessor at running 4 MHz, used the CP/M version 2 operating system with 64K of RAM and, with installation of an Intel 8086 microprocessor expansion card, a modified version of Microsoft's MS-DOS operating system. The RAM can be upgraded to 640Kb and had several programs in ROM. It contained a single speaker for sound output (which could be set to give audible feedback when keys were pressed) and two RS-422 serial ports for communication. It also supported monochrome bit-mapped graphics, and introduced the concept of desk accessory programs, such as a calendar, calculator and auto-run timer that could be run without closing a user application. This innovative application set, known as Valet, predated the appearance of similar functionality in the 1984 Macintosh.

The brainchild of Ron Lingeman, a gifted H-P alumnus, the Attache was significantly smaller, sleeker, lighter and faster than the Osborne 1 and other portable computers of the time. Unlike the Kaypro, Attache was not IBM compatible. The Attache was both more capable and more expensive than its competition in many ways. The Attache was meant to run on AC power; batteries were not part of the package but an external battery could be attached.

The 1983 "8:16" model included the 8086 coprocessor expansion board as a built-in option. Compatibility with the IBM PC was only partial, but allowed the popular Lotus 1-2-3 spreadsheet application to run on the Attache.

== Otrona 2001 ==
In May 1984, Otrona introduced the "2001" model an IBM PC compatible which had an Intel 8088 CPU as its primary microprocessor. This model was meant to be a lighter weight and technologically superior alternative to the mainstream IBM and Compaq luggable products of the day. Otrona engaged in a ground up development effort of the more, but not yet fully, PC-compatible 2001 computer, incorporating a PC BIOS written by Steve Gray.

This model's larger CRT was hinged, pivoting upward for easier viewing while boasting twice the resolution of standard PC's. While retaining its low weight (for the time), it also offered a hard disk option, an Z80A CPU card for CP/M compatibility and, unlike the 8:16 model, provided greater PC compatibility with more than twice the speed of a standard PC. Despite the innovative packaging, added features and superior performance, this $3,995 product ended up costing more than anticipated to produce, and never had a chance to succeed as it pushed further the failure of Otrona that filed for bankruptcy shortly after its release.

Market acceptance of the IBM PC and lagging sales of the not quite PC-compatible 8:16 and 2001 models created a revenue gap that was too deep to overcome. Otrona was caught in a catch-22 in which they could not buy parts needed to generate revenue with the 2001 and could not hit the revenue targets needed to draw on their credit line in order to buy the needed parts. By this time the banks and venture capitalists had invested heavily and taken a hard-edged approach to further investment. Despite the pending success of the 2001, they declined to provide further funding. Otrona had simply not responded quickly enough to the new market conditions created by the introduction of the IBM PC.

== Bankruptcy ==
After seven years of innovation, Otrona announced in September 1984 that it was ceasing production and gave immediate termination notices to its 175 employees. The company initially filed for Chapter 11 bankruptcy protection, hoping to find a way to recover, but refiled a few days later under Chapter 7 and its assets were subsequently liquidated.

About 5,000 of the Attache model were sold and can still be found occasionally in auctions and flea markets. The 2001 model barely made a mark at all and probably ranks as one of the rarest of the early PC clones.
