= Andrew Kay =

American computer businessman (1919–2014)

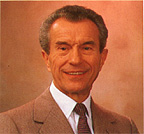
- Born: Andrew F. Kay; January 22, 1919
- Died: August 28, 2014 (aged 95)
- Other names: Andy
- Spouse: Mary
- Children: 4

Andrew F. Kay (January 22, 1919 – August 28, 2014) was a businessman and innovator. He was President and CEO of Kaypro, a personal computer company, which at one time was the world's fourth largest manufacturer of computers, and the largest in the world in sales of portable computers.

Kay, a 1940 graduate of MIT, started his career with Bendix followed by two years at Jet Propulsion Laboratory. In 1952, Kay founded Non-Linear Systems, a manufacturer of digital instrumentation. NLS developed a reputation for providing rugged durability in critical applications for everything from submarines to spacecraft. At NLS he invented the digital voltmeter, in 1952.

He founded Kaypro Corporation as a subsidiary of NLS in 1982, to sell computers. In 1985, it had more than $120 million in revenue, dwarfing what had been its parent, NLS. But the company's success was relatively short-lived; in 1990 it filed for Chapter 11 bankruptcy protection, and it was liquidated in 1992.

In the late 1990s, Kay founded Kay Computers, which similarly manufactured and sold personal computers. The company lasted for less than ten years.

Kay later was a Senior Business Advisor to Accelerated Composites, LLC.

He co-founded the Rotary Club of Del Mar, California.

Andrew Kay died at age 95 in August 2014.
