= Non-Linear Systems =

- Industry: electronics manufacturing
- Founded: 1952
- Founder: Andrew Kay
- Website: www.nonlinearsystems.com

Non-Linear Systems is an electronics manufacturing company based in San Diego, California. Non-Linear Systems was founded in 1952, by Andrew Kay, the inventor of the digital voltmeter in 1954.

NLS developed a reputation for providing rugged durability in critical applications for everything from submarines to spacecraft.

Later the company developed miniature digital voltmeters and frequency counters. During the early 1980s the company started Kaypro, which developed an early personal computer.
