= Xerox 860 =

Early stand-alone word processor from Xerox

Xerox 860 IPS
- Also known as: Xerox 860 Information Processing System
- Developer: Xerox Corporation
- Manufacturer: Xerox Corporation
- Product family: 800-series
- Type: Word processor
- Released: December 11, 1979; 46 years ago
- Introductory price: US$15,300 (equivalent to $68,000 in 2025)
- Media: 8" floppy disks
- Operating system: Xerox Proprietary, CP/M
- CPU: Intel 8085
- Memory: 96 or 128 KB
- Storage: 2 x 8" floppy drives (single or double-sided)
- Display: Portrait-oriented CRT
- Graphics: 66 lines x 102 characters (Full Page Display); 24 lines x 102 characters (Partial Page Display)
- Input: Detachable keyboard with optional CAT cursor control pad
- Connectivity: Serial, Parallel, Ethernet
- Power: US version: Voltage: 103–127 VAC single phase (two wires plus ground); Frequency: 59–61 Hz; Current: One complete system requires one 15 amp circuit European version: Voltage: 193–264 VAC single phase (two wires plus earth); Frequency: 50 Hz; Current: One complete system requires one 13 amp circuit
- Dimensions: Controller: 762 × 305 × 711 mm (30 × 12 × 28 in); Display: 330 × 381 × 355 mm (13 × 15 × 14 in); Keyboard: 102 × 508 × 229 mm (4 × 20 × 9 in); Printer: 208 × 630 × 483 mm (8.2 × 24.8 × 19 in)
- Weight: Controller: 79 kg (174 lb); Display: 10.5 kg (23 lb); Keyboard: 3 kg (6.5 lb); Printer: 27 kg (60 lb)
- Predecessor: Xerox 850
- Related: Xerox 800, Xerox 820

The Xerox 860, officially named Xerox 860 Information Processing System (IPS), was an early word processor incorporating many features later available in personal computers.

== Overview ==
Although marketed as a dedicated word processor, the Xerox 860 was in reality a general-purpose computer capable of running various applications beyond word processing. The Xerox 860 was also the first commercially available computer with Ethernet connectivity.

The Xerox 860, codenamed Rodeo, was developed by the Xerox Office Products Division (OPD) in Dallas, Texas. The codename possibly reflects the product's Texas origins.

The Xerox 860 represented an architectural advancement over its predecessor, the Xerox 850. While the 850 had its operating system and applications stored in ROM, the 860 featured only a small loader in ROM. This design required the operating system and all applications to be loaded from floppy disks.

This architecture provided several advantages: it enabled the distribution of operating system updates without hardware changes, supported third-party applications, and eventually made it possible to run alternative operating systems.

The system was widely used in the United States Navy, which by 1986 had deployed approximately 2,000 Xerox 860 units throughout its fleet. The Xerox 860 was also popular among screenwriters, used by Brian Garfield and David Cronenberg. Authors Desmond Bagley and Robert Ringer where early users of the Xerox 860.

== Hardware ==
=== Display ===
The 860 featured a portrait-oriented, full-page word processing screen capable of displaying 66 lines of 102 characters each. Unlike the landscape orientation of most modern displays, the 860's screen was taller than it was wide—specifically designed to show an entire page as it would appear when printed.

The display used a black-on-white format that could be toggled to white-on-black based on user preference. Text appeared in actual pitch (10, 12, or Proportional Spacing) with justified text displayed exactly as it would print. For improved readability, the screen included a "Zoom" feature that doubled character height, along with both horizontal and vertical scrolling capabilities.

With a vertical refresh rate of 70 Hz—above average for the era—the display was marketed as "flicker-free".

=== Keyboard ===
The Xerox 860 offered two keyboard variants, both with standard typewriter layouts and a few special function control keys. Both were detachable from the display unit. The only difference was that one variant included the "CAT" cursor control pad (Capacitive touch-activated transducer), an early form of touchpad first introduced with the Xerox 850 in 1977 that allowed direct cursor positioning on the screen.

=== Storage ===
The Xerox 860 IPS came standard with two 8-inch floppy disk drives, available in either single-sided or double-sided configurations supporting single-density formatting.

Early marketing materials suggested that double-sided double-density drives with 1.2 MB capacity and 8-inch fixed hard drives with capacities of 5MB or 10MB would be offered, but these options appear to have never been released.

=== Printer capabilities ===
The standard printer had an average speed of 35 characters per second on typical documents (including tabbing, indexing, and carrier returns). It printed bi-directionally for increased efficiency. The printer supported 10 pitch, 12 pitch, or Proportional Spacing by changing print wheels, with multiple type styles available. Various ribbon options were offered in combinations of multi-strike, single strike, fabric, and colors.

The printer could operate while the user continued working on the system, allowing up to 20 documents to be queued for unattended printing per workstation. An optional Automatic Paper Feeder accessory could be added, which held up to 200 sheets in both input and output trays, automatically collated printed documents, adjusted margins and tabs as required, and alerted operators when more paper was needed.

== Software ==
=== Operating system ===
The Xerox 860 was initially released with a Xerox proprietary operating system. This operating system managed the basic functions of the machine while providing word processing capabilities.

As a consequence of the 860's flexible design, CP/M was eventually offered as an alternative operating system. This differed from Xerox's later product, the Xerox 820, which was specifically designed around the CP/M operating system from the beginning.

=== Word processing ===
The primary application for the Xerox 860 was its word processing software, which offered sophisticated document formatting capabilities.

The system allowed for format blocks and global settings. Format blocks controlled margins, tabs, and line spacing from their insertion point until another block or document end. Documents could use single or multiple format blocks. Global settings controlled screen display, edit preferences, and page layout.

Additional features included a visible format scale, global search and replace, background reformatting and pagination, and horizontal scrolling for wide documents.

=== Additional applications ===
Xerox offered several additional software applications for the 860:

- BASIC Language Interpreter allowed users to write and run programs in the BASIC programming language
- Records Processing provided database-like functionality for managing structured data
- Validator offered spell-checking capabilities
- WP SORT provided text sorting utilities

=== Software distribution and copy protection ===
==== Master Discs System ====
The Xerox 860 employed a software distribution system based on "Master Discs." These floppy discs could boot the system, but only into a special "Disc Creation and Modification" environment, not into the regular operating system or word processor. Users were required to create "System Discs" from these Master Discs through a specific procedure that involved copying the software and configuring system parameters. Only these System Discs could then be used to boot the 860 into its normal working environment.

==== Copy protection and "locking" ====
The Xerox 860 implemented a copy protection scheme through a mechanism known as "locking" or "personalization" based on the serial number of the particular machine:

- Master Disc Locking: Master Discs were designed to be used on any 860 system for creating System Discs. However, the first time a Master Disc was used to create a System Disc, the Master Disc would become locked to that specific system. Attempting to use a locked Master Disc on another system would generate an "INCORRECT MASTER" error message.
- System Disc Locking: When a System Disc was created, it became locked to the particular machine that created it. The system wrote a unique code to the floppy disc that prevented it from being used in any other 860 system. If a user attempted to boot a System Disc in a different machine, the system would display an "INCORRECT SYSTEM DISC" error.
- Program Locking: Optional application programs like "Validator" (a spell checker) and "WP SORT" were also distributed on "Master Discs". The application Master Discs would lock to the first system that they were used on to create system discs.

== Legacy ==
The Xerox 860 represented an important step in the evolution of office automation systems, bridging the gap between dedicated word processors and personal computers.

Despite its innovative features, the Xerox 860 did not achieve widespread adoption, likely due to its high selling price. This positioned it as a premium product primarily accessible to large corporations rather than the broader business market.
