= Sprint (word processor) =

Sprint is a text-based word processor for MS-DOS, first published by Borland in 1987.

== History ==
Sprint, originally known as The FinalWord application, is developed by Jason Linhart, Craig Finseth, Scott Layson Burson, Brian Hess, and Bill Spitzak at Mark of the Unicorn (MOTU) - a company (headquartered in Cambridge, MA) which is now better known for its music software products. At the time MOTU sold MINCE and SCRIBBLE, a text editor package based on Emacs. As The FinalWord, the package met with some success in the sense that the manuals for Lotus Development's software packages were written on it, as was Marvin Minsky's book The Society of Mind.

FinalWord II was renamed to Sprint when it was acquired by Borland, which added a new user interface, new manuals, and features to the application. The editor speed was considered blazing at the time, running with no delays on machines as slow as 8 MHz.

This was the time of European development for Borland: Sidekick and Turbo Pascal had been founded in Denmark; and the management of the European subsidiary comprised former Micropro France managers (Micropro was at the time the world leader in Word processing software with the famous WordStar line-up. They had success with the launch of WordStar 2000 - the first word processor package with a spelling dictionary in French.)

As a result, the development and advertising of the product was carried out in France. Sprint is one of the very few major projects from an American software program publisher that had a French version shipped earlier than the American version.

Sprint v1.0 shipped in France with notable initial success, capturing a 30 percent market share and getting the jump on competing word processors. MicroPro was weakening with old Wordstar products and still-new WordStar 2000; WordPerfect was having problems with the translation and the user interface; and MS-Word was a decent but less polished or powerful product, and was also DOS and text-based.

The lack of beta-test mixed with pressure to ship for back-to-school time resulted in a Sprint 1.0 which had a range of minor glitches and bugs that had to be corrected with model 1.01 and a whole new set of diskettes for each registered user.

Version 1.0 (equivalent of French 1.01) shipped a few months later in the US and rest of world, with a mixed reception from customers. Traditional Borland fans who bought Sprint were happy with the editor, but wondered why the package included a sophisticated formatter, while business users who wanted a word processor just to write their memos and letters wondered what to do with the heavy manual and powerful features of the formatter language. In any event, word processing was shifting to WYSIWYG.

Version 1.5 shipped with a number of new features and real stability in France, but never made it elsewhere, although a number of localized versions had been built for various European countries. At the time, Borland Scandinavia had gone bankrupt, while Borland France had to be saved by massive financial help from the US. The developers who had once worked in Europe had to move to the Scotts Valley, California premises. Version 1.5 was a reasonable success in France for some years, but Microsoft Word and Windows gained momentum and obscured all the other products.

In North America, Sprint never really gained traction in the marketplace, as it was overshadowed by WordPerfect and then Microsoft Word. It built up a small, but loyal and often enthusiastic, following among professional writers, researchers, academics, and programmers who appreciated its power, speed, and ability to handle large documents. Borland did not believe that there was enough of a market to warrant updating the product, and it eventually stopped supporting it.

== Features ==
Crash-recovery: Sprint had incremental back-up, with its swap file updated every 3 seconds, enabling full recovery from crashes. At trade shows, demos were made with one person pulling out the power cord, and the typist resuming work as soon as the machine restarted.

Spell-as-you-type: With this feature, Sprint could beep at you in real time when detecting a typo.

Multilingual editing: Sprint included dictionary switching, support for hyphenation, and spelling and thesaurus dictionaries that have yet to be matched by the competitors.

Separate formatter and programmable editor: These have been useful features for corporate environments aiming at standardizing documents or building "boilerplate" contracts. In France, for example, applications were built for Banques Populaires (loan contracts) or Conseil d'Etat, while some local government agencies created specific applications for tenders and contracts.

Powerful programming language: Programming in Sprint was done with the internal language of the word processor - a language that is much like C. Programmers have the ability to "get under the hood" and add modifications and extensions to an extent not possible with other word processors. Once written, Sprint programs are compiled into the interface, and run at full speed.

Interface switching: Modifications and extensions to Sprint can be saved into separate interfaces which can be easily and quickly switched. This is useful for people working in different languages, as the keys can be mapped to the accents and characters of each language, depending on the interface.

File handling: Users could work in up to 24 files at once. All open files could be saved on exit or not—and nevertheless automatically reopened as left, including each file's cursor position, cut and paste buffer contents, and spell check status. Because this behavior was accomplished using the crash-recovery swap file (see above), it allowed an "instant-on" behavior using the saved state from the previous run; this was unusual for its time.

Handling large documents: Sprint has the ability to publish large documents (hundreds of pages) with strict formatting consistency and automatic table of contents, index generation, tables of figures, and tables of authorities. These features made Sprint a leader in the production of technical documents - and Borland itself did all its manuals on Sprint, for years.

PostScript capabilities: Sprint could print in-line EPS images with dimensioning, and also had the ability to add in-line PostScript procedures. This made the product rather popular in the printing industry. For example, making a 200-page novel fit into 192 pages was simply a matter of changing the point size from 11 to 10.56. Sprint could size by 0.04 increment and scale the line spacing and kerning accordingly. (The 192 pages size is important in the printing industry, where the number of pages often has to be divisible by 32. A 200-page book would have to be printed using 224 pages, the extra 24 pages being empty.)

Consistency with familiar environments: The default editor key bindings were a subset of those provided by EMACS, and the mark-up language was a subset of Scribe, making it easy for people familiar with those tools to use Sprint.

== Reception ==
BYTE in 1984 praised FinalWord 1.16's low memory requirements and many powerful features. Criticisms included great difficulty in learning how to use it and instability, including a serious bug that destroyed four days of work. The magazine in 1989 listed Sprint as among the "Distinction" winners of the BYTE Awards, stating that "if you can live without [WYSIWYG], Sprint may be all you need in word processing software".

== See also ==
- MINCE

== External references ==
Manuals are on the "Wayback Machine", the Internet Archive in several formats, emobi, pdf, djvu, etc.

FROM https://archive.org/search.php?query=borland%20sprint

1. Borland Sprint Reference Guide 1988 (Jan 8, 2013) From the bitsavers.org collection, a scanned-in computer-related document. Topics: sprint, command, menu, text, file, commands, choose, formatter, chapter, format, reference guide,... Bitsavers

2. Borland Sprint Users Guide 1988 (Jan 8, 2013) texts From the bitsavers.org collection, a scanned-in computer-related document. Topics: sprint, file, text, choose, command, menu, files, typestyle, press, user, user interface, record... Bitsavers

3. Borland Sprint Advanced Users Guide 1988 (Jan 8, 2013) texts From the bitsavers.org collection, a scanned-in computer-related document. Topics: sprint, command, text, macro, format, file, commands, formatter, advanced, chapter, sprint... Bitsavers

4. Borland Sprint Alternative User Interfaces 1988 (Jan 8, 2013) texts From the bitsavers.org collection, a scanned-in computer-related document. Topics: sprint, user, menu, command, interface, wordstar, commands, msword, file, alternative, use Bitsavers
