= Vaccine bundling =

Contractual agreement offered by some pharmaceutical companies to pediatricians

Vaccine bundling is a contractual agreement offered by some pharmaceutical companies to pediatricians, that gives a discount to doctors purchasing pediatric vaccines, but only if the physicians agree to buy the majority of their vaccines from a single manufacturer. It is a form of product bundling.

== Economic incentives ==
Many pediatric practices struggle to remain profitable as the cost to administer vaccines has increased. By some estimations, vaccines can have the second highest impact on a pediatric practice's finances. As a result of these and other factors, many pediatricians have joined group purchasing organizations as a way to leverage their purchasing power and take advantage of the reduction in prices for vaccines and other products.

While this aggregation of buying power allows pediatricians to negotiate lower prices for products, concerns have been raised by economists and consumer groups that the bundling contracts that require pediatricians to buy all of their vaccines from one company inhibit competition, impede the introduction of new vaccines, reduce physician choice and, ultimately, drive up the costs of vaccines to physicians, the government, and taxpayers. In response to this criticism, pharmaceutical companies have stated bundling is one of the options available to pediatricians, and the contracts are lawful and provide real value.

== Public health concerns ==
On January 3, 2012, the economic consulting firm Compass Lexecon published a white paper on the Social Science Research Network titled “The Effects of Bundled Discounts on Entry in the Market for Pediatric Vaccines.” The paper stated the strategic goal of pediatric bundling is to make it more difficult for rival vaccine makers to enter a new market. The paper said that the long-term effects of bundling are:

- The development of fewer new vaccines
- Fewer vaccine suppliers
- A decrease in the likelihood of improving current vaccines
- A risk of vaccine shortages due to dependence on a small number of manufacturers and suppliers.

The authors concluded vaccine bundling is inconsistent with the goals of the National Vaccine Program Office and at odds with public health.

A separate analysis, funded by the Swiss pharmaceutical company Novartis, concluded vaccine bundling and other factors could result in elevated prices, stifled investment, innovation in the vaccine sector, and degradation in the quality, reliability and availability of existing and future pediatric vaccines.

== FTC scrutiny ==
Possible legal issues with the marketing of vaccine bundles by Sanofi Pasteur Inc and Merck & Co. were first brought to the Federal Trade Commission (FTC) in July 2010 by the watchdog group Citizens for Responsibility and Ethics in Washington (CREW). Subsequently, the American Antitrust Institute wrote to the FTC in November 2011, requesting an investigation into anticompetitive practices in the pediatric vaccine market. In both letters the restrictive nature and possible penalties for breaking the bundling contracts were highlighted as the reason for requesting an investigation.

A third letter to the FTC sent on March 19, 2012, cited a former Sanofi employee to support allegations that the companies are engaged in anticompetitive bundling practices.

In response, both companies stated the agreements are well intended and lawful, telling The Hill that the contracts meet customer needs and maximize immunizations rates which protect public health.

The FTC has acknowledged it received the letters, but does not comment on investigations unless wrongdoing is found.

== Antitrust lawsuits ==
Two class action lawsuits have been filed charging Sanofi Pasteur Inc. with violating U.S. antitrust laws, as a result of its bundling practices. The suits challenge Sanofi's alleged “anticompetitive scheme” to maintain its monopoly in the U.S. meningitis vaccine market. These lawsuits have since been consolidated.

In both cases, plaintiffs were parties to exclusionary contracts with Sanofi Pasteur to purchase vaccines. Each plaintiff wanted to purchase a different meningitis vaccine manufactured by Novartis that they thought to be superior. According to documents, if they purchased this vaccine and therefore did not use Sanofi's pediatric vaccines exclusively, they would have to pay Sanofi 15 to 34 percent higher prices for all Sanofi vaccines. The lawsuits claim that, due to Sanofi's prominence in the vaccine market, the contracts make it virtually impossible for competitors to gain any market share. Sanofi responded that there are alternatives to all of the vaccines in the bundle, and that Novartis already has 20 percent of the market share for its competing vaccine.

In defending its practices, Sanofi contended the plaintiffs did not claim they were coerced by the bundling into not purchasing other vaccines, and did not have standing to sue because the bundling contracts were negotiated by physician buying groups, not the individual doctors themselves, and therefore only those groups would have standing.

The cases are currently pending in U.S. District Court for the District of New Jersey.

== See also ==
- Group purchasing organizations
- Pharmaceutical marketing
- Pharmaceutical industry
- List of pharmaceutical companies
