= MINCE =

MINCE is a text editor, originally created for 8080-based microcomputers running the CP/M operating system. Later versions of MINCE were available for GEMDOS on the Atari ST, VAX/VMS, RSX-11, and various flavors of Unix.

Developed in BDS C by Mark of the Unicorn, it was bundled with computers from Kaypro and Morrow Designs, and the Epson QX-10. It was a subset of Emacs (MINCE stands for "MINCE Is Not Complete Emacs") designed to run within the 64kB memory limit of 8-bit computers.

The editor used a gap buffer to fit within 48kB, and implemented a very efficient virtual memory system to support multiple buffers and a maximum file size limited only by available disk space.

MINCE was a companion product to SCRIBBLE, a text formatter based on Scribe. This separation of duties into editor plus formatter was common among advanced word processors at that time.

Although it was not open source, MOTU distributed partial code they deemed most useful for extending the product.

In 1981, MINCE and SCRIBBLE were sold together, along with their source code and the BDS C compiler, as a software bundle for US$350 (almost US$1000 in 2014 dollars) under the name "Amethyst". Amethyst was available without the compiler for $250, and MINCE and SCRIBBLE were available alone for $175. In 1984 the list price of MINCE was US$175. (equivalent to US$433.22 in 2019).

MINCE and SCRIBBLE were later developed into the Perfect Writer and FinalWord word processors. FinalWord later became Sprint.

An open source project, Portable MINCE, allows the CP/M-80 version of MINCE to run on current operating systems and provides customizations, extensions, and documentation for the editor.
