= Ladder (video game) =

1982 video game

- Title screen
- Developer(s): Yahoo Software
- Publisher(s): Kaypro
- Platform(s): Kaypro
- Release: 1982
- Genre(s): Platform
- Mode(s): Single-player

Ladder is a platform game similar to Nintendo's Donkey Kong written for the CP/M operating system and made to be operated on the early Kaypro line of luggable computers. Ladder was written by Yahoo Software of Los Angeles, California. Along with Star Trek, CatChum and Aliens, Ladder was one of the games that came with the software bundle of the early Kaypro computers.

== Gameplay ==
Since the Kaypro only has a text mode, the game uses letters, numbers, and symbols lined up to create walls and platforms, pits/traps, characters, trampolines and goals. The floors in Ladder are made of equal signs, and the ladders themselves are made of capital "H"s stacked on top of each other. The "lad" controlled by the player starts out as the letter "P" (lowercase "q" on left), the treasure is the dollar sign "$" and the ampersand "&", and barrels ("der rocks") are represented by "o"s.

The catchphrase of the game reminded the acolyte player that there are more ways than one to skin a cat. This referred to the fact that the minimized traverse of almost all levels could be enhanced by inventive utilisation of the game features, and the highest levels absolutely required it. These could entail (at the apex of the game) for instance jumping on a trampoline at precisely the right speed and point of impact to fall into one of the pit/traps, at the right timing that there would be no barrels passing for a sufficient interval.
