= Micro Cornucopia =

American microcomputer hobbyist magazine (1981–1990)

- Editor: David J. Thompson
- Categories: Computer magazines
- First issue: July 1981
- Final issue Number: May 1990; 53
- Country: United States
- Based in: Bend, Oregon
- Language: English
- ISSN: 0747-587X

Micro Cornucopia, sometimes shortened to Micro C, was a 1980s magazine for microcomputer hobbyists and enthusiasts. It was published in Bend, Oregon by former Tektronix engineer David J. Thompson.

The magazine, conceived as a newsletter for users of the Ferguson Big Board (a single-board CP/M computer), was published bi-monthly beginning in July 1981. It soon expanded its coverage to other board-level computers, the Kaypro computer, and general hobbyist/experimental computing, with special interest areas being robotics, interfacing, embedded systems and programming languages. The magazine routinely published circuit diagrams and source code.

Micro C carried articles on a wide range of subjects, some system-specific and newsletter-like, but also covering (then) off-mainstream topics, e.g. 3D graphics, artificial intelligence, or the special needs of disabled users. They published a 32-page catalog of CP/M and MS-DOS software, cover date Fall/Winter 1986, describing it as the second, the first having been the Spring issue.

The publishers of Micro C organized free annual user conference dubbed "SOG" (Semi-Official Get-together) in Oregon.

== Final issue ==
In issue 53, May 1990, Thompson wrote, "I'm closing down Micro C and I don't know what I'll be doing next." He explained his loss of interest in the magazine, and subscribers were offered the choice to switch to one of several other magazines, including Computer Language.

== Personnel ==
- Publisher: David J. Thompson
- Technical Editor: Larry Fogg
- Regular contributors & staff:
  - Scott Robert Ladd
  - Bruce Eckel
  - Tony & Becky Ozrelic
