= Aliens (1982 video game) =

- Developer(s): Yahoo Software
- Publisher(s): Kaypro
- Platform(s): Kaypro
- Release: 1982
- Genre(s): Fixed shooter
- Mode(s): Single-player

Aliens is a text-only clone of Space Invaders written for the CP/M operating system and made to be operated on the early Kaypro line of luggable computers. It was written by Yahoo Software of Los Angeles, California. Along with Star Trek, CatChum, and Ladder, Aliens was one of the games that came with the early Kaypro computers.

== Gameplay ==
The game runs in text mode; the aliens are made of letters and punctuation marks. Each level was given a name, displayed on top of the screen, such as "Blood Bath" and "We Come in Peace."
