= Perfect Writer =

Word processor computer program

- Original author: Perfect Software
- Initial release: 1982; 44 years ago
- Written in: C
- Operating system: CP/M, MS-DOS
- Predecessor: MINCE
- Type: Word processor

Perfect Writer is a word processor computer program published by Perfect Software for CP/M. In 1984, Thorn EMI Computer Software acquired an exclusive marketing and distribution licence for Perfect Software's products, and the program was rewritten and released as Perfect II for IBM PC compatible computers. Written in C and famous for its stability, it is an enhanced version of MINCE, which itself is a version of Emacs for microcomputer platforms. Emacs itself is too large to fit within the 64 KB RAM limit of most microcomputers. Like MINCE, it includes a floppy disk based virtual memory system.

Along with its companion spreadsheet (Perfect Calc), and database (Perfect Filer), Perfect Writer was bundled with early Columbia Data Products, Kaypro II, and Morrow computers, as well as with the Torch Computers Z80 Disk Pack add-on for the BBC Micro and had a list price of US$349. In the UK, it was bundled with the short lived Advance 86B PC (a near IBM compatible). Perfect Writer supports up to 7 buffers and has a character transpose command, undo, footnotes, and indexing. Its capabilities are very close to that of contemporary dedicated word processors. Perfect Writer's ability to cut and paste between documents open in multiple buffers was an advantage over WordStar.

As of February 1983 half of Perfect Software's revenue came from OEM sales, but the company lowered prices so much to win the contracts that it lost money. Thorn EMI agreed to distribute Perfect's products after the former decided to not acquire the latter.

Perfect Writer supports a number of add-on programs, Perfect Speller and Perfect Thesaurus, also published by Perfect Software, along with third party software such as Plu*Perfect published by Plu*Perfect Systems. Plu*Perfect includes "D", a dired-like file browser that was deemed "the best of all directory displayers" by Stewart Brand.

Perfect Writer was originally published by Perfect Software. Later versions of the product were developed and maintained by Knowledge Engineering in Austin, Texas. The thesaurus was designed, written, and maintained by George O. Jenkins, Jr.

== Reception ==
In a 1985 review of inexpensive word processors, PC Magazine approved of Perfect Writer's power, adjustable menu-display delay, multiple windows, and thesaurus and spell checker.
