= CatChum =

1982 video game

- Title screen
- Developer: Yahoo Software
- Publisher: Kaypro
- Platform: Kaypro
- Release: 1982
- Genre: Maze
- Mode: Single-player

CatChum is a text-only clone of Pac-Man written for the CP/M operating system and made to be operated on the early Kaypro line of luggable computers.

CatChum was made within the limitations of Kaypro's early text-only computers. As a result, the maze is made from a series of dashes and other punctuation marks. The Pac-Man character is a letter C, which goes from upper to lower case intermittently (to simulate a chomping Pac-Man). The four ghosts are capital As (which turn to lowercase ms when the CatChum Pac-Man chomps a power-pellet, capital Ms when the effect is about to end), and the "fruits" are represented by dollar signs. One of the major down sides of this clone is that Kaypros of that era did not have the ability to flip the text characters. As a result, even when the character is chomping pellets on his left, for example, his chomping mouth is still on the right.

There is no sound. Instead, flashing text messages appear every now and then saying things like "Get Set!", "Get Ready!" or "Go for it!"

Along with Star Trek, Aliens and Ladder, CatChum was one of the games that came with the software bundle of the early Kaypro computers.

CatChum was written by Yahoo Software of Los Angeles, California.
