= Product bundling =

Offering several products as one

In marketing, product bundling is offering several products or services for sale as one combined product or service package. It is a common feature in many imperfectly competitive product and service markets. Industries engaged in the practice include telecommunications services, financial services, health care, information, and consumer electronics. A software bundle might include a word processor, spreadsheet, and presentation program into a single office suite. The cable television industry often bundles many TV and movie channels into a single tier or package. The fast food industry combines separate food items into a "combo meal" or "value meal". Unbundling refers to the process of breaking up packages of products and services which were previously offered as a group or bundle.

A bundle of products may be called a package deal; in recorded music or video games, a compilation or box set; or in publishing, an anthology.

Product bundling is most suitable for high volume and high margin (i.e., low marginal cost) products. Research by Yannis Bakos and Erik Brynjolfsson found that bundling was particularly effective for digital information goods with close to zero marginal cost, and could enable a bundler with an inferior collection of products to drive even superior quality goods out of the market place.

Most firms are multi-product or multi-service companies faced with the decision whether to sell products or services separately at individual prices or whether combinations of products should be marketed in the form of "bundles" for which a "bundle price" is asked. Price bundling plays an increasingly important role in many industries (e.g. banking, insurance, software, automotive) and some companies even build their business strategies on bundling. In bundle pricing, companies sell a package or set of goods or services for a lower price than they would charge if the customer bought all of them separately. Pursuing a bundle pricing strategy allows a business to increase its profit by using a discount to induce customers to buy more than they otherwise would have.

== Rationale ==
Bundling is most successful when:

- There are economies of scale in production.
- There are economies of scope in distribution. This can be seen in consumer electronics bundles where a big box electronics store offers all of the components for a home theatre setup (DVD player, flatscreen TV, surround sound speakers, receiver, subwoofer) for a lower price than if each component were to be purchased separately. The big box electronics store can exploit its economies of scope, as they distribute and sell a huge range of home theatre products.
- The marginal costs of bundling are low.
- Production set-up costs are high.
- Customer acquisition costs are high.
- Consumers appreciate the resulting simplification of the purchase decision and benefit from the joint performance of the combined product or service. This is particularly the case when a non-specialist consumer has information asymmetry when trying to buy all of the components of a home theatre (speakers, connection cables, speaker wire). He/she would need to learn about all of the product specifications and the requirements for accessories used with the main items. For example, with Home Theatre in a Box, a consumer can feel confident that all of the included speakers are of the correct impedance and power rating and that all of the included cables are the correct models.

While many well-known examples of bundling are all products or services from the same store or provider, such as the sports package for a car or a grocery store's gift basket, in some cases, cross-industry bundles are assembled and sold. For example, some travel agencies have vacation tour bundles that may include air tickets, rail tickets, a rental car, hotels, restaurants, museum and sightseeing attraction tickets and live music event tickets. These bundles include products and services from the transportation, accommodation, tourism, food service and entertainment industries.

Consumers have heterogeneous demands and such demands for different parts of the bundle product are inversely correlated. For example, assume consumer A values a word processor software at $100 and a spreadsheet processor at $60, while consumer B values a word processor at $60 and spreadsheet at $100. Seller can generate a maximum revenue of only $240 by setting a $60 price for each product—both consumers will buy both products. Revenue cannot be increased without bundling because as the seller increases the price above $60 for one of the goods, one of the consumers will refuse to buy it. With bundling, a seller can generate revenue of $320 by bundling the products together and selling the bundle at $160. Thus, bundling can be considered a form of price discrimination.

Venkatesh and Mahajan reviewed the research on bundle design and pricing in 2009. A 1997 study by Mercer Management Consulting, in Massachusetts stated that good bundles have five elements: (1) the package is worth more than the "sum of its parts" for the consumer; (2) the bundle brings order and simplicity to a set of confusing or tedious choices; (3) the bundle solves a problem for the consumer; (4) the bundle is focused and lean in an effort to avoid carrying or including options, goods or services the consumer has no use for; and (5) the bundle generates interest or even controversy. Number 1 can be read as simply that a bundle should cost less than buying each item separately; however, even if the bundle were to cost the same in dollars, a bundle may still be an appealing value proposition for a consumer, as they do not have to hand-pick each accessory and add-on item (this is the 2nd and 3rd point).

Bundling is often thought of mainly as a value pricing strategy, in that product bundles often cost less than if each item were purchased separately. However, bundling can also have other strategic advantages. For example, when a grocery store is making up a gift basket, they can use the design of the basket item list as a way to promote new products or brands that a customer may not know or as a way to liquidate merchandise that is not selling well. Also, even though many bundles are less expensive than all of the items if purchased separately, in some cases the bundle costs more than if each item was purchased separately; this tactic is particularly effective in high-end retailing where conspicuous consumption and prestige pricing elements come into play. A well-off home theatre enthusiast with a very high budget may find a $10,000 home theatre package attractive, even if it costs a bit more than buying each item separately, because this is an impressive total cost.

== Varieties ==
Pure bundling occurs when a consumer can only purchase the entire bundle or nothing at all. There are two sub-categories of pure bundling:

- Joint bundling, where the two products are offered together for one bundled price, and
- Leader bundling, where a leader product is offered for discount if purchased with a non-leader product, accessory or other item.

Mixed bundling occurs when consumers are offered a choice between purchasing the entire bundle or one of the separate parts of the bundle, and mixed-leader bundling is a variant of leader bundling with the added possibility of buying the leader product on its own.

== Advantages and disadvantages ==
Advantages:

- Help the company sell some unpopular products and speed up inventory clearance. Product bundling combines the best-selling products and unpopular products with less inventory by setting reasonable prices to increase the attractiveness, so that consumers can buy combination products to help the company reduce inventory.
- Help the company generate more sales and maximize profits. Product bundling can maximize consumer surplus so that consumers feel that they have obtained additional items, so customers are more likely to spend a total of one time to purchase multiple products. This can help the company increase total sales revenue by increasing the average order value, average transaction value, and the amount of each transaction, because multiple products are more expensive than a single product.
- Enable the company to promote more differentiated products with lower marketing costs. The company can spend the same energy and cost to promote two or more products at the same time.
- Help consumers reduce decision-making pressure. Merchants use matching algorithms to set up bundled products that meet the needs of consumers, thereby guiding customers to choose options that meet their needs and reducing their decision fatigue. Bundles have the effect of reducing search costs.

Disadvantages to the consumer:

- Decreases competition.
- Reduces consumer choice: consumers may be forced to buy bundles which don't contain all the things they wanted, and contain things they don't want, and may even be pushed into buying inferior products. For example, two companies both sell a bundle containing a computer and an operating system, but one has poor-quality hardware and one has poor-quality software. The consumer wants to buy each company's good product, but can't unless they pay for two computers and two operating systems and throw one of each away. A new company which sells only hardware or only operating systems also has to persuade the consumer to throw away a purchased product; this is a barrier to market entry.
- Can drive up consumer costs.
- A method of price discrimination.

Disadvantages to the seller:

- Product bundling may lead to the cannibalization of branded products. These products can be purchased outside of the bundled sales package. For example, if a company sells bundled products and individual products at the same time, then the bundled products will get more sales, which will reduce the profit of the individual products.
- When consumers cannot buy certain products individually, they may not buy them because they feel that the bundled sales package forces them to buy more products.

== Software ==
In the computer industry, bundled software is distributed with another product such as a piece of computer hardware or other electronic device, or is a group of software packages which are sold together. Software which is pre-installed on a new computer is an example of bundled software. For example, as of 2017, most desktop, laptop and mobile computers are bought pre-loaded with various software and software applications ("apps"). A pack-in game is a form of bundled software.

Early microcomputer companies varied in their decision to bundle software. BYTE in 1984 observed that "Kaypro apparently has tremendous buying and bargaining power", noting that the Kaypro 10 came with both WordStar and Perfect Writer, plus "two spelling checkers, two spreadsheets, two communications programs and three versions of BASIC". (Perfect Software won the contract by charging much less than the cost of producing the software, part of a price war among business-software companies that almost resulted in Perfect's collapse in 1984.) Stating that year that a computer that weighs 30 pounds "really isn't very portable", Creative Computing concluded that "the main reason that the Osborne was a success was not that it was transportable, but that it came with a pile of bundled software". Compaq, by contrast, did not bundle software, stating that "You remove the freedom from the dealers to really merchandise when you bundle in software ... Why should you be constrained to use the software that comes with a piece of hardware? I think it can tend to inhibit sales over the long run." MacWrite's inclusion with early Macintosh computers discouraged developers from creating other word processing software for the computer. Many companies sold multimedia upgrade kits—a CD-ROM drive, sound card, speakers, and what Computer Gaming World described as "a boatload of bundled software"—during the mid-1990s.

== Home theatre in a box ==
In the 1990s and in the 2000s (decade) and 2010s, many consumer electronics companies designed home theatre equipment bundles, known as Home Theatre in a Box (HTIB). For a customer who already owned a TV, and in some cases a DVD player or other source for playing back movies, a HTIB package provides all of the electronics hardware, speakers and cables needed to set up a home cinema. There are three grades of HTIB bundles: economy bundles, aimed at the lowest price point; mid-tier bundles, the most common type; and higher-cost HTIB bundles made by BOSE and other higher-end manufacturers. At the economy grade HTIB package, the customer is provided with a basic home theatre set-up, with modest sound quality and relatively few options for adjusting the sound. The mid-tier and upper-tier packages offer better performance and more set-up options. All three HTIB tiers, though, have a similar value proposition for the buyer: the HTIB package ensures that all of the speakers are of the correct impedance and power handling capabilities, the cables are of the correct type, and the crossover points and other technical details have been set up by the manufacturer.

The most serious home theatre enthusiasts do not typically buy HTIB bundles, as they are a more sophisticated target market. As such, the most serious home cinema-philes typically purchase each component (power amplifiers, speakers, subwoofer cabinet, speaker cables) separately, so that they can choose which items meet their specific movie-watching goals. For example, a serious home theatre enthusiast may wish to have a large cabinet subwoofer enclosure with heavy bracing, a type and size of subwoofer cabinet that would not be found in any HTIB bundle due to its large size and high cost. As well, a serious home theatre enthusiast may wish to have a powered subwoofer with a user-adjustable crossover, a "subsonic" filter and other higher-cost advanced features.

== Market power and competitiveness ==
In oligopolistic and monopolistic industries, product bundling can be seen as an unfair use of market power because it limits the choices available to the consumer. In these cases it is typically called product tying. Some forms of product bundling have been subject to litigation regarding abuses of market share.

=== United States v. Microsoft ===
United States v. Microsoft was a set of civil actions filed against Microsoft Corporation pursuant to the Sherman Antitrust Act of 1890 Sections 1 and 2 on May 18, 1998, by the United States Department of Justice (DOJ) and 20 states. Joel I. Klein was the lead prosecutor. The plaintiffs alleged that Microsoft abused monopoly power on Intel-based personal computers in its handling of operating system sales and web browser sales. The issue central to the case was whether Microsoft was allowed to bundle its flagship Internet Explorer (IE) web browser software with its Microsoft Windows operating system. Bundling them together is alleged to have been responsible for Microsoft's victory in the browser wars as every Windows user had a copy of Internet Explorer.

== TV programing bundles by cable and satellite providers ==
Cable and satellite television (Pay TV) have bundled TV channels since the inception of both. In the early years of the cable industry this was necessary due to the technological constraints associated with allowing and blocking channels transmitted via analog methods. The progress towards complete cable, internet, and telephone packages gave subscribers many more options as well as offering hundreds of channels. The "package" price depends on the level of service a customer prefers within each bundle. The services range from low speed internet and minimum channels to high speed internet and the addition of many premium channels. In the US prices for pay TV have doubled in the last twenty years, averaging 6% per year, while wages have remained the same for nearly 20 years causing dissatisfaction and many cancellations. Costs have risen 53% since 2007 and Comcast and AT&T's Direct TV went up in January 2018. With the Digital television transition opportunities for competition to pay TV ushered in online video companies and forcing pay TV companies to examine à la carte cable company packages.

A 2018 consumer report shows many subscribers are dissatisfied with cable TV, mainly over prices, which has led to many complaints. Google Fiber was an exception to widespread consumer dissatisfaction. Verizon and the two satellite-TV companies —AT&T's DirecTV and Dish Network rated better than Cox Communications, Comcast, Spectrum, Optimum, CenturyLink, SuddenLink Communications, Atlantic Broadband, Frontier Communications, and Mediacom was rated at the bottom. Internet providers EPB (Fiber Optics) and Google Fiber received top ratings for value. Of the smaller companies only Armstrong received top ratings and RCN, Hawaiian Telcom (bought by Cincinnati Bell in 2018), and Grande Communications received slightly higher ratings.

The high price of current complete bundling, upwards of $180–200, along with poor customer service, surprise bills, and technical difficulties, resulted in Angie's List reporting that these things were the number two most complained about category.

Alternative streaming-based providers of cable TV channel bundles in the United States, also known as vMVPDs, such as FuboTV, Hulu + Live TV, Philo, Sling TV, and YouTube TV, launched in the 2010s, providing additional options for consumers who want access to linear cable channels but are dissatisfied with local providers. Additionally, reduced-price bundles of streaming service packages, such as The Disney Bundle, are also offered by some providers.

== See also ==
- Breakage
- Bundling (public choice)
- Competition law
- Compilation album
- Enterprise engagement
- Freebie marketing
- History of IBM § 1969: Antitrust, the unbundling of software and services
- Local loop unbundling
- Marketing co-operation
- Multicart
- Package holiday
- Price discrimination
- Product lining
- Product management
- Shovelware
- Software bloat
- Tying (commerce)
- Vaccine bundling
