= Mark of the Unicorn =

Music software and hardware company

- Industry: Computers
- Founded: 1981
- Headquarters: Cambridge, Massachusetts
- Products: Music software Computer software Computer hardware
- Website: motu.com

Mark of the Unicorn (MOTU) is a music-related computer software and hardware supplier developed by Jason Linhart, Craig Finseth, Scott Layson Burson, Brian Hess. It is based in Cambridge, Massachusetts and has created music software since 1984. In the mid-1980s, Mark of the Unicorn sold productivity software and several games for the Macintosh, Atari ST, and Amiga.

== History ==
The company's trademark registration for the name "Mark of the Unicorn", granted on 24 February 1987, records first use of the name in commerce on 1 September 1980, and gives the registrant's address as Cambridge, Massachusetts. The company states that it was founded in 1980.

The company's earliest products were text-editing tools for CP/M machines. According to Craig A. Finseth's survey of Emacs implementations, MINCE was first distributed in 1980 and was written in C; the related PerfectWriter, The FinalWord and FinalWord II products were subsequently sold to Borland International.

Mark of the Unicorn's Performer MIDI sequencer was released in 1985. Reviewing the program in Music Technology in 1990, Kendall Wrightson recalled that computer-based sequencers "were often regarded as a novelty" at the time of its release, and that Mark of the Unicorn's customers were sequencing on Macintoshes two years before the Atari ST and Pro24 combination became established.

By 1994 Sound On Sound described Performer as "arguably the best MIDI sequencer available for the Macintosh, having been around almost as long as the Mac". Its review of Digital Performer that January covered the addition of hard disk audio recording, which brought the company into competition with Cubase Audio and Studio Vision.

=== Audio interfaces ===
In 2001 the company released the 828, a rack-mounting FireWire audio interface aimed at Macintosh models shipped without PCI slots. Reviewing it in July 2001, Sound On Sound noted that users "have been asking for a serious FireWire audio interface" and that the unit was already back-ordered.

A redesigned 828 was introduced in 2024 with USB 3.0 in place of FireWire and support for macOS, Windows and iOS, priced at US$995. MOTU marketing director Jim Cooper told Mix that the redesign was prompted in part by component shortages during the COVID-19 pandemic, and repeated the company's claim to priority: "We shipped the very first one in 2001. That was the first firewire audio interface ever."

== Products ==
=== Current ===
- Digital Performer
- AudioDesk

=== Past ===
- MINCE and SCRIBBLE, an Emacs-like editor and Scribe-like text formatter for CP/M machines. MINCE was also available for the Atari ST.
- FinalWord word processor (sold and became Sprint).
- Professional Composer, one of the first graphical music-notation editors. Version 2.0,reviewed by Sound On Sound in November 1986, shipped on a single 3.5-inch disk with a 200-page manual and allowed note entry by either mouse or keyboard, unconventional time signatures such as 13/16 and 31/32, automatic beaming and tying, transposition and the merging of parts onto a single staff. It could import MIDI files from the company's Performer sequencer for notation, and printed to the ImageWriter or LaserWriter. It then cost £369.57, against £260 for Performer.
- Mouse Stampede, arguably the first arcade-style game available for the Apple Macintosh (1984).
- Hex game for the Atari ST and Amiga computers (released in 1985). Antic called the Atari ST version "a clean piece of programming and one of the best strategy-board games I've seen on a computer".
- The first FireWire Audio Interface for Mac and Windows.
- PC/Intercomm, VT100 emulator for the Atari ST.

== Awards ==
Mark of the Unicorn products have received several TEC Awards:

- 1987, Computer Hardware/Software – Performer version 1.22
- 1989, Music Software Technology – Performer version 2.41
- 1990, Computer Software/Peripherals – Performer 3
- 1991, Computer Software/Peripherals – Digital Performer sequencer
- 2000, Ancillary Equipment – MOTU MIDI Timepiece AV-USB with MTS

Sound On Sound additionally reported that Digital Performer won the 1992 TEC award for best computer software or hardware product.
