= Scribe (markup language) =

Markup language and word processing system

- Developed by: Brian Reid, Scribe Systems
- Type of format: Markup language
- Extended to: Texinfo
- Open format?: Yes

Scribe is a markup language and word processing system that innovated the use of descriptive markup. Scribe was notable when it was proposed, because it involved for the first time a clean separation of presentation and content.

== History ==
=== Beginnings ===
Scribe was designed and developed by Brian Reid of Carnegie Mellon University. It formed the subject of his 1980 doctoral dissertation, for which he received the Association for Computing Machinery's Grace Murray Hopper Award in 1982.

Reid presented a paper describing Scribe in the same conference session in 1981 in which Charles Goldfarb presented GML (developed in 1969), the immediate predecessor of SGML.

=== Sale to Unilogic ===
In 1979, at the end of his graduate-student career, Reid sold Scribe to a Pittsburgh-area software company called Unilogic (later renamed Scribe Systems), founded by Michael Shamos, another Carnegie Mellon computer scientist, to market the program. Reid said he simply was looking for a way to unload the program on developers that would keep it from going into the public domain.

Michael Shamos was embroiled in a dispute with Carnegie Mellon administrators over the intellectual-property rights to Scribe. The dispute with the administration was settled out of court, and the university conceded it had no claim to Scribe.

=== Time-bomb ===
Reid agreed to insert a set of time-dependent functions (called "time bombs") that would deactivate freely copied versions of the program after a 90-day expiration date. To avoid deactivation, users paid the software company, which then issued a code that defused the internal time-bomb feature.

Richard Stallman saw this as a betrayal of the programmer ethos. Instead of honoring the notion of "share-and-share alike", Reid had inserted a way for companies to compel programmers to pay for information access.

Stallman's Texinfo is "loosely based on Brian Reid's Scribe and other formatting languages of the time".

== Using the Scribe word processor ==
Using Scribe involved a two-step process:

1. The writer would type up a manuscript file that conformed to Scribe's syntax.
2. This file would be processed through the Scribe compiler to generate an associated document file, which could be printed.

The Scribe markup language defined words, lines, pages, spacing, headings, footings, footnotes, numbering, tables of contents, etc. in a manner similar to HTML. The Scribe compiler used a database of styles containing document format definitions.

Because of the separation of concerns between the content (structure) of the document and its style (format), writers did not need to concern themselves with the details of formatting.

== The markup language ==
The idea of using markup language, in which meta-information about the document and its formatting were contained within the document itself, first saw widespread use in a program called RUNOFF; Scribe contained the first robust implementation of declarative markup language.

In Scribe, markup was introduced with an @ sign, followed either by a Begin-End block or by a direct token invocation:

@Heading(The Beginning)
@Begin(Quotation)
    Let's start at the very beginning, a very good place to start
@End(Quotation)

It was also possible to pass parameters: @MakeSection(tag=beginning, title="The Beginning").

Typically, large documents were composed of Chapters, with each chapter in a separate file. These files were then referenced by a master document file, thereby concatenating numerous components into a single large source document. The master file typically also defined styles (such as fonts and margins) and declared macros like MakeSection shown above; macros had limited programmatic features. From that single concatenated source, Scribe computed chapter numbers, page numbers, and cross-references.

These processes replicate features in later markup languages like HTML. Placing styles in a separate file gave some advantages like Cascading Style Sheets, and programmed macros presaged the document manipulation aspects of JavaScript.

== Related software ==
The FinalWord word processor from Mark of the Unicorn, which became Borland's Sprint, featured a markup language which resembled a simplified version of Scribe's. Before being packaged as FinalWord, earlier versions of the editor and formatter had been sold separately as MINCE ("MINCE Is Not Complete Emacs") and Scribble respectively.

LaTeX extends TeX with the descriptive markup ideas of Scribe.

The Ada Reference Manual is written in a Scribe-like format, which is transformed into plain text, HTML, and PDF documents via a formatting tool.

== See also ==
- Markup language
- TeX
- LaTeX
