= Kodak Proofing Software =

Software to manage the process of prepress proofing

Kodak Proofing Software is an application from Eastman Kodak for managing and controlling the process of Prepress proofing. It supports the Veris printer, Kodak Approval and various inkjet printers from Epson and Hewlett Packard.

The four dots: blue/yellow, red/green used in the splash screen and application icon are a symbolic representation of the Lab color space central to color management technology.

== History ==
Kodak Proofing Software is derived from the original Creo software used to control the Veris printer. In 2005 Kodak purchased Creo and the software first became internally known as Kodak Proofing Software, whereas Kodak Veris, Kodak APPROVAL and Kodak MATCHPRINT Inkjet are the proofing solutions marketed to customers.

Veris 1.6 was released in 2004 by Creo. Much of the actual functionality of the Veris printer is actually embedded in the Veris software. Compared to conventional drop-on-demand inkjet printers the Veris hardware is quite 'dumb' relying on the controller software for most of its high level functions.

The Creo Integris proofing solution for drop-on-demand printers was a re-marketed version of software from Best. Best was later bought by EFI.

Kodak Proofing Software 3.0 was released in fall 2005 which added support for the Epson Stylus Pro drop-on-demand inkjet printers. This was used to replace the previous Integris software. During the acquisition of Creo, Kodak Polychrome Graphics (KPG) had their own proofing solution for inkjet printers known as MATCHPRINT ProofPro, but Kodak decided to replace it with the Veris derived software instead.

The trademark MATCHPRINT came from the Imation analog and thermal proofing media. KPG bought Imation, KPG and Creo. The MATCHPRINT name was kept for brand recognition value.

Version 3.1A was released summer 2007 which added support for the Kodak APPROVAL proofing system.

Version 4.0 was released Summer 2009 which added n-color processing and a new calibration technology known as Precision Color. The previous 4-color technology, known as ColorZone, is not able to handle the new 6 and 7 color printers that have become popular because of their wider color gamut. Also Precision Color introduced a progressive or iterative calibration method that is more accurate than the single shot calibration used in ColorZone.

== Architecture ==
Kodak Proofing Software is a client/server solution. The server, written in C++ and C#, runs on Windows XP and performs all the fundamental processing of color images and control of the printers. The client, written in Java, runs on Macintosh and Windows computers and presents the user interface to the system. There is a many-to-many relationship between clients and servers.

There are two connectivity modes for Kodak Proofing Software: with Direct Connectivity users can submit jobs directly from Prinergy or Brisque workflow systems into Kodak Proofing Software; with Open Connectivity users can just drop press-ready PDF files into hot folders. With Direct Connectivity the raster image processing is performed by Prinergy, whereas with Open Connectivity it is performed internally by Kodak Proofing Software (using a subset of Prinergy technology).
