= Approval proofer =

Prepress proofing system

Within the printing industry, the Approval proofer, also known as the Approval Digital Imaging System or Kodak Approval System, was designed for use in Prepress proofing, especially for the highest quality contract proofs.

The Approval is a laminate based system where up to 6 color donors can transfer images to a receiver sheet by a high-powered laser. Once imaging is complete the image can be transfer to a wide variety of substrates including papers, boards, shrink wrap, plastics, metals, etc.

The system comes in two sizes: The 3-page model images a proof 13.3 × 20.9 in. (338 × 530 mm); the 4-page model images a proof 26.6 × 20.9 in. (676 × 530 mm)

The Approval is similar to the Fuji Finalproof product. Another similar lamination device is the Creo Spectrum (now supported by Kodak) which is unique in that proofs are created on the actual plate-setting device (the Creo/Kodak Trendsetter).

== History ==
The Approval was introduced to the market by Kodak in 1991, and continues to be sold and used in printing shops as of 2010. The Approval Classic (original) version quickly became the market standard for contract proofs. That was quickly followed in 1995 by Approval PS. In 1998 there was a major redesign which is the basis for the contemporary product. The Approval NX released in 2004 decreased the printing time of spot colors giving users significant productivity improvements. There is continued research and development aimed at improving the quality and usefulness of Approval output.

== Prepress Applications ==
The Approval was designed to mimic the quality of Printing presses using high resolution imaging (2,400 or 2,540 DPI similar to the printing plate) and halftone screening to accurately reflect what would be seen on press. Stochastic screening (or FM screening) can also be used to proof print runs with this screening technique. Being able to simulate screening effects with high fidelity makes it possible to detect undesirable screening artifacts (i.e. Moiré patterns) before going to press, consequently saving customers time and money.

The Approval system allows control over screen angles, screen ruling, density control per color, dot gain adjustment and dot shapes.

The wide range of color donors makes it possible to simulate accurately process, corporate, brand, spot and special colors. Process donors include cyan, magenta, yellow and black. Additional donors, orange, green and blue, extend the color gamut. There are 2 opaque donors: white and metallic. The metallic donor combined with the other color donors allows for the creation of a wide range of metallic colors such as gold, copper, bronze, etc. This produces special effects not possible via inkjet printers but commonly used in today’s packaging.

The Approval is especially useful in packaging applications because it is possible to transfer the images to so many of the different substrates used in the packaging industry. The white donor is a critical tool in replicating packaging printing that will be applied to clear packaging. The adjustable laydown order allow exact representation of the prepress shops most difficult print jobs such as package labels and lottery cards were white or silver is required on the top and bottom. Often customers want three-dimensional mock-ups of the actual package. This could be cardboard, metal (i.e. aluminum pop can), glass, plastic, shrink wrap, etc. Approval proofs are highly effective for these applications.

As of 2010 the Approval supports several certified workflows: Kodak Proofing Software (KPS), Prinergy, Kodak (HQ-1), Brisque, EskoArtwork FlexRIP and Nexus, and Rampage RIPS / workflows with direct connections through the Open Front End (OFE) interface. Nexus, MetaDimensions, and Screen Trueflow all interface through the Approval Interface Toolkit software (AIT).
