= Iris printer =

Color inkjet printer for prepress proofing

An Iris printer is a large-format color inkjet printer designed for prepress proofing. It was introduced in 1985 by Iris Graphics, originally of Stoneham, Massachusetts, and is currently manufactured by the Graphic Communications Group of Eastman Kodak. It is also used in the fine art reproduction market as a final output digital printing press, as in giclée.

Prints produced by an Iris printer are commonly called Iris prints, Iris proofs or simply Irises.

== History ==
The Iris printer was developed by Iris Graphics, Inc. originally of Stoneham, Massachusetts. Iris was founded in 1984 by two former employees of Applicon, Inc., Dieter Jochimsen and Craig Surprise, who had worked with Professor Helmuth Hertz of Lund University in Sweden, from whom Applicon had licensed the continuous-flow inkjet technology used in an Applicon-manufactured large-format printer. Jochimsen and Surprise were joined in founding Iris by John Oberteuffer and Richard Santos after being introduced by the U.S. licensing agent for Professor Hertz' inkjet patents, Arthur D. Little of Lexington, Massachusetts. The Iris model 2044 large-format printer, capable of printing on paper up to 34" × 44" (864 × 1118 mm), was first shipped in 1985. A smaller model, 3024, which supported automatic handling of 11" × 17" (279 × 432 mm) paper, was introduced at the September 1987 "Lasers in Graphics" show in Miami. The company was acquired by Scitex in 1990, which was then purchased by Creo Products Inc. in 2000. In 2005, Creo was purchased by Kodak. The Iris product line evolved into the Veris printer line.

== Design ==
The Iris printer is an inkjet printer designed to interface with digital prepress systems to produce a hard copy that shows what the exact image will look like before the job goes to press. Such prepress output devices are used to check the image and for critical color match on industrial printing jobs such as commercial product packaging and magazine layout. Their output is also used to check color after mass production begins. Iris printers use a continuous flow ink system to produce continuous-tone dot free output. The paper used in the machine is mounted on a drum rotating at 150 inches per second. Unlike most ink jet printers which fire drops only when needed, the IRIS printer's four 1-micrometer glass jets operate continuously under high pressure, vibrated by a piezoelectric crystal to produce drops at a 1 MHz rate. The droplets are given an electric charge so that the ones that are not needed to form the image are deflected electrostatically into a waste system.

== Use in fine art reproductions ==
Iris printers have also been used since the late 1980s as final output digital printing devices in the production of fine art reproductions on various media, including paper, canvas, silk, linen and other textiles. There were many printers, photographers, artists, and engineers who saw the merit in using this industrial proof printer as a way to produce high-resolution color accurate reproductions. Color engineer David Coons used the 3024 at the Walt Disney Company to print images from Disney's new computer 3D animation system. He also wrote software to print works created on desktop computers such as Sally Larsen 1989 Transformer series, and a 1990 photo exhibition for Graham Nash of Crosby, Stills, and Nash. Nash was so impressed with the quality of the Iris prints, he purchased his own Iris Graphics 3047 ink-jet printer for $126,000 to print further editions of his work and eventually set up Nash Editions, a digital reproduction company based on the Iris printer. There were many problems with adapting the Iris printer to fine art printing including modifying the machines to take heavy paper stock and dealing with the poorly fade-resistant (fugitive) nature of the inks.

Because of the Iris printer's connection to digital, ink-jet industrial and home/office printing, one of the print makers at Nash Editions, Jack Duganne, thought such terms might have bad connotations in the art world. He came up with a neologism for the process, the coined name "giclée". Similarly, Nash and Mac Holbert, manager of Nash Editions, came up with the name "digigraph" for this type of print.

In the 2010s the Iris printer was for the most part superseded in the fine art printing business by Epson and other large-format printers that are much cheaper than the Iris and use inks designed to be archival.
