= Giclée =

Fine-art inkjet prints of digital files or artwork

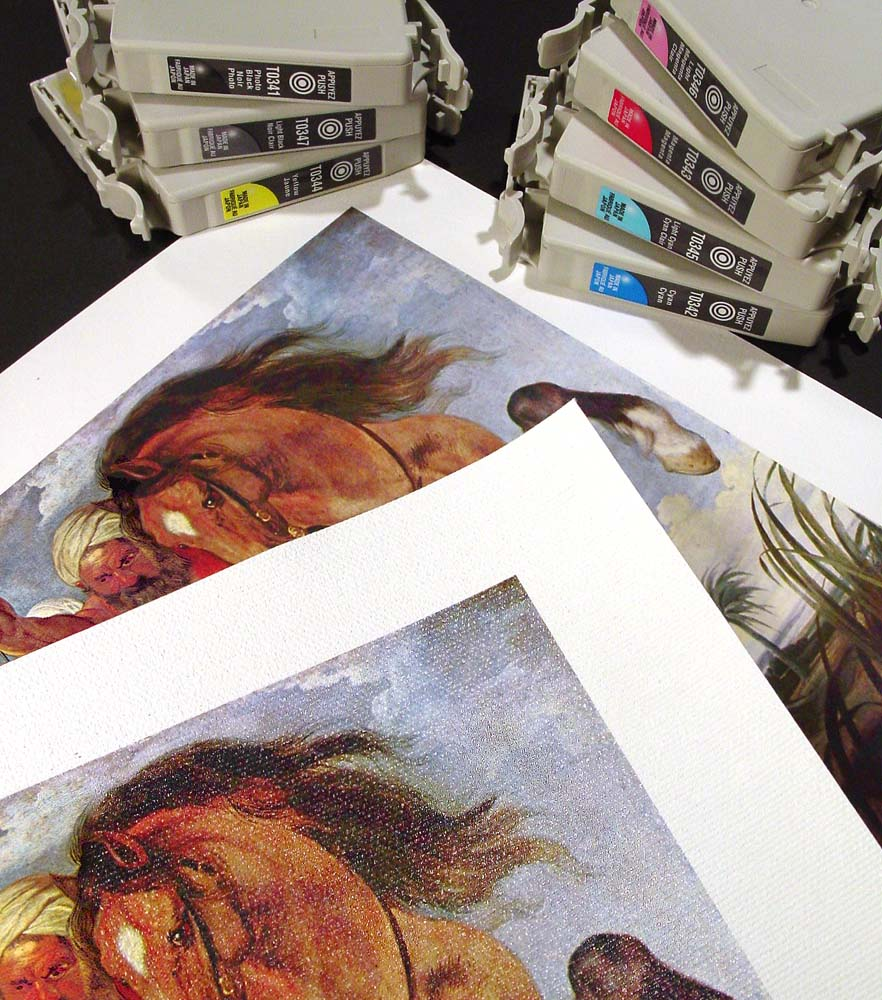
The Hippopotamus and Crocodile Hunt by Peter Paul Rubens, printed on paper and canvas stock, with the seven Epson pigmented ink printer cartridges used to produce it (printer and prints commonly called giclée)

Giclée (/ʒiːˈkleɪ/ zhee-KLAY) describes digital prints intended as fine art and produced by inkjet printers. The term is a neologism, ultimately derived from the French word gicleur, coined in 1991 by printmaker Jack Duganne. The name was originally applied to fine art prints created on a modified Iris printer in a process invented in the late 1980s. It has since been used widely to mean any fine-art printing, usually archival, printed by inkjet. It is often used by artists, galleries, and print shops to describe high-quality inkjet-based fine-art printing; however, in broader and informal usage, the term may also be applied generically to art prints of varying quality.

== Origins ==
The word giclée was adopted by Jack Duganne around 1990. He was a printmaker working at Nash Editions. He wanted a name for the new type of prints they were producing on a modified Iris printer, a large-format, high-resolution industrial prepress proofing inkjet printer on which the paper receiving the ink is attached to a rotating drum. The printer was adapted for fine-art printing. Duganne wanted a word that would differentiate such prints from regular commercial Iris prints then used as proofs in the commercial printing industry.

=== Etymology ===
Giclée is based on the French word gicleur, the French technical term for a jet or a nozzle, and the associated verb gicler ('to squirt out'). As a noun, une giclée means a spurt of some liquid. The French verb form gicler means to spray, spout, or squirt. Duganne settled on the noun giclée.

== Current usage ==
In addition to its original association with Iris prints, the word giclée has come to be loosely associated with other types of inkjet printing including processes that use dyes or fade-resistant, archival inks (pigment-based). In professional fine-art contexts, pigment-based inks are generally preferred over dye-based inks due to their significantly higher resistance to fading and environmental degradation. These processes often involve archival substrates primarily produced on Canon, Epson, HP, and other large-format printers. These printers use the CMYK (Cyan, Magenta, Yellow and Black) color process as a base with additional color cartridges for smoother gradient transitions (such as light magenta, light cyan, light and very light gray), up to 12 different inks in top model printers (orange, green, violet (Epson); red, green, blue (HP); 11+ Chroma Optimizer [a clearcoat] (Canon)) to achieve larger color gamut. A wide variety of substrates on which an image can be printed with such inks are available, including various textures and finishes such as matte photo paper, watercolor paper, cotton canvas, pre-coated canvas, or textured vinyl. The choice of substrate and coating is an important factor in how pigment-based inks behave and are preserved over time.

== Applications ==
Artists generally use inkjet printing to make reproductions of their original two-dimensional artwork, photographs, or computer-generated art. Professionally produced inkjet prints are much more expensive on a per-print basis than the four-color offset lithography process traditionally used for such reproductions. A large-format inkjet print can cost more than ten times that of a four-color offset litho print of the same image in a run of 1,000, not including scanning and color correction. Four-color offset lithographic presses have the disadvantage of the full job having to be set up and produced all at once in a mass edition. With inkjet printing the artist does not have to pay for the expensive printing plate setup or the marketing and storage needed for large four-color offset print runs. This allows the artist to follow a just-in-time business model in which inkjet printing can be an economical option, since art can be printed and sold individually in accordance with demand. Inkjet printing has the added advantage of allowing artists to take total control of the production of their images, including the final color correction and the substrates being used. As a result, numerous individual artists own and operate their own printers. In professional fine-art contexts, the choice of archival paper and framing conditions, including UV-filtering glazing, is a relevant factor in the long-term stability and color preservation of giclée prints.

== See also ==
- Printmaking
- Digital printing
- Canvas print
