= Stripping (printing) =

Preparation and assembly of printing negatives in pre-press

Within the commercial printing industry, the job of stripping involves arranging and joining film negatives as part of the process of preparing printing plates. In the UK, the same operation is termed "planning" and film positives are used, rather than the negatives in the USA. Because the industry has largely moved to digital processes, the job of stripping, or planning has become rare or even obsolete.

Negatives may be set up in a pattern to allow a printing press to print 4, 8, 16 or 32 pages at a time, front and back, which are then folded to produce a brochure or book with the correct pagination (see figure). Conversely, a variety of smaller printed products of various sizes may be arranged on a single larger press sheet to be cut down after printing into individual job components, such as business or post cards, folding boxes or hang tags.

== Color and density ==
For color processes, an individual black and white, "screened" negative is used to represent each color in a four-colour process (Cyan, Magenta, Yellow and Black) to be printed on a printing press. A screened negative has varying sizes of dots arranged in a particular pattern to represent greater or lesser density of image. Typically, a 150 dots-per-inch screen is used to create each printing negative, though this will varying depending on the application, where a magazine may use 200 line screens and a newspaper may use 120 to 133 line screen. The screen is rotated at successively varied angles to ensure that the dots do not print exactly on top of one another.

"Cleaning" a negative of unwanted artifacts (noise) from the line camera process, (lines, etc., from the edges of traditional hot-wax analog "font" paste-up, and dirt), would be done by scraping the exposed emulsion from the negative with an X-Acto Knife (for areas intended to be exposed on the printing plate). Similarly, negatives were "opaqued" with an opaquing solution applied with a brush, or felt-tipped pen, or (opaque) red adhesive tape (for larger areas), to prevent exposure of white specs, noise, etc., especially on large fonts.

== Alignment ==
Each negative must be precisely aligned and secured by tape to a light-blocking paper or plastic mask. The painstaking alignment of the negatives requires a stripper to use high-magnification eye piece while viewing the work on top of a light table to achieve exact positioning. Once secured, the area of the mask through which light must pass is removed with an Exacto knife or razor blade.

== Exposure and developing ==
The completed mask with opened exposure windows is then placed atop a photo-sensitive printing plate, which both plate and mask with stripped negatives fixed by register pins, and then vacuum-sealed in a framed enclosure under glass and exposed to very bright light, allowing the rays to pass through the negatives and expose the printing plate's surface. The plate is then developed and the unexposed areas are washed away, leaving behind cured emulsion that will hold the ink on press. A single etched plate is necessary for each color to be printed.

== Digital prepress ==
The process of stripping for general commercial offset printing has largely been eliminated through the use of digital prepress technology, in which imposition software is used to "digitally strip" the pages together. Some printing technologies continue to use stripped film, especially in silk-screen printing, although this is likely to change in the near-term. The digital product of this imposition software can be outputted to an imagesetter that creates a single, composed piece of film, or directly to a platesetter which generates a plate that can go directly to press.
