= Process camera =

Camera used for reproducing documents

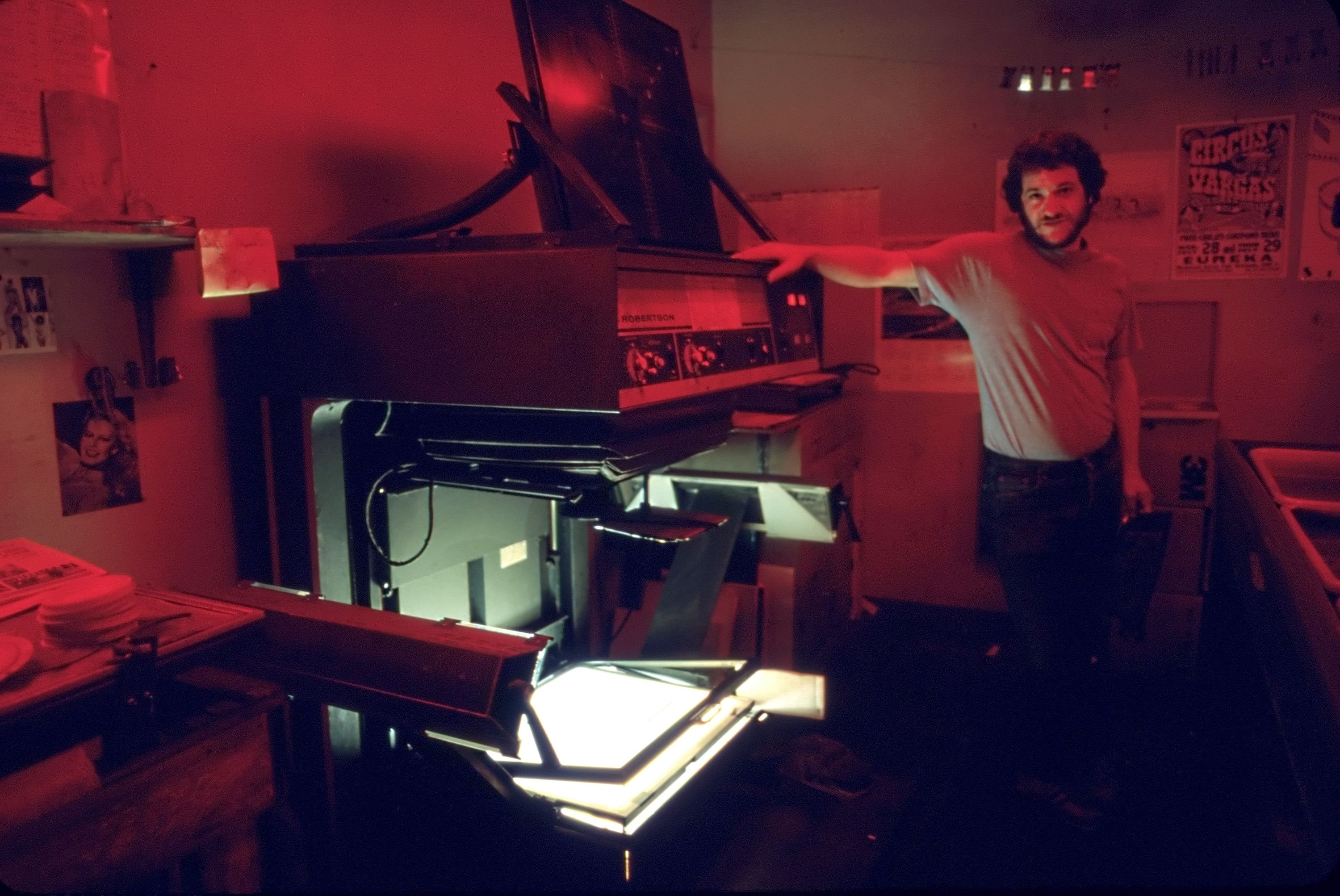
A process camera in a California newspaper darkroom in the mid-1980s.

A process camera is a specialised form of camera used for the reproduction of graphic material. Before the advent of color scanners, color process work was undertaken by the process camera, by a skilled operator. This was achieved by using various filters to produce a set of four film separations — cyan, magenta, yellow and black (CMYK). This, in turn, was usually color-corrected by another tradesman called a color retoucher. After the introduction of color scanners in the 1970s, the process camera was gradually only used for monochrome line-work or less often monochrome tone-work. The original artwork was photographed and the negatives produced were eventually used for production of printing plates.

This task was completed by another skilled tradesman called a "film make-up planner", who would use a contact frame to photograph the various film layers they had created containing masked tints, text in film form and the separations produced by the process camera or color scanner. The final film sets were used to produce printing plates, in a process called stripping. Prepared film was then placed into a vacuum frame that was used to expose the image onto the ultraviolet-sensitive printing plates. Finally, exposed plates would be developed and processed for printing. See offset printing and photozincography (heliozincography) for more information on this process.

Producing printing plates via photographic methods was pioneered in Great Britain by Ordnance Survey around 1893. This process lasted around 100 years before digital technology made it become obsolete very quickly.

Process cameras were still widely in use until the late 1980s and early 1990s. By that time, a combination of digital camera, desktop publishing, and finally computer to plate technologies became economically viable and had significant advantages over the analogue process cameras. There was a reduced need for staff to operate the cameras and produce final film and this also meant that the chemicals, film and subsequent expense required for traditional methods were no longer necessary. In some industries, large production areas were replaced by one relatively compact machine, this also having a significant effect on the buildings used for graphic reproduction. As a result, the process camera has become obsolete and very few remain in use. However, some camera operators and film planners (strippers) moved transitioned to the new technologies of desktop publishing and computer-to-plate, fundamentally doing the same job, but using different tools.
