= Veris printer =

Medium format inkjet printer

The Veris printer is a medium format (4 up) 1500 DPI color inkjet printer manufactured by the Graphic Communications Group of Eastman Kodak, which is used for digital Prepress proofing. A refinement of the Iris printer, the Veris also uses a continuous flow ink system to produce continuous-tone output on specially designed media. Unlike most inkjet printers which fire drops only when needed, the Veris uses eight 10 micrometer glass jets that operate continuously under high pressure, vibrated by a piezoelectric crystal to produce drops at a 1 MHz rate, or 8 million drops per second in total. Drops that are not needed to form the image are deflected electrostatically into a waste collection system, and individual drops can be directed to a specific position on the media. The Veris prints with the same quality of the Iris, only faster because of the larger number of jets (or pens as they are called).

== History ==
The Veris printer was originally developed by Iris Graphics, which was acquired by Scitex and later merged with Creo Products Inc. In 2005 Creo was purchased by Kodak. The Veris was first released in 2004 and production of the Veris ended in 2008. Although, the product is still supported and in use as of 2010. Adoption of the Veris was less than stellar as the quality of drop-on-demand inkjet printers continues to approach the quality of Veris output.

== Prepress applications ==
The Veris hardware and software is designed around needs of prepress proofing services with some notable features founded on process automation and process control principles.

The Veris uses an automated stack fed media tray. The printer incorporates a small video camera that is used to scan media marks printed on the edges of the media. These are effectively like two-dimensional bar-code marks that uniquely identify each sheet of media and contain other information such as the media type and even the lot number the media was produced from. The software prevents the media from being printed on more than twice - it is possible to print on one half of the media, flip the media around and print on the other half. The software also prevents the wrong type of media from being used for the wrong job, and can search for the correct media from the input tray of the printer.

Later models of the Veris include an in-line spectrophotometer to further automate the calibration of the printer and verify the color standard of proofs printed. Around the same time Hewlett Packard added an in-line spectrophotometer to their HP 2100 printer. Years later Epson added an in-line spectrophotometer to their Stylus 7900/9900 printer line.

The Veris software evolved into the Kodak Proofing Software which is used to support Kodak's Approval and Matchprint InkJet solutions.
