= Approval =

Approval may refer to:

- Approval rating, a polling term which reflects the approval of a particular person or program
- Approval voting, a voting system
- Approval proofer, an output device used in Prepress proofing
- Approved drug, formal government approval of a medication for sale
- Social approval, the positive appraisal and acceptance of a person by a social group
