= Color key =

Color key may refer to:

- Chroma key composition, a special effects technique layering images or video streams together
- Colorist work and the materials used, adding details to black-and-white line art
- Prepress proofing guides, used for fine-tuning items in printing presses
