= Stochastic screening =

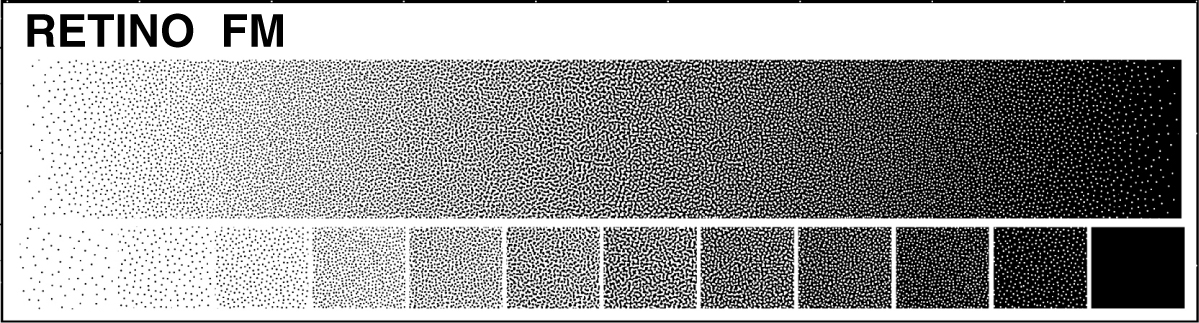
Shades of gray produced by FM screening.

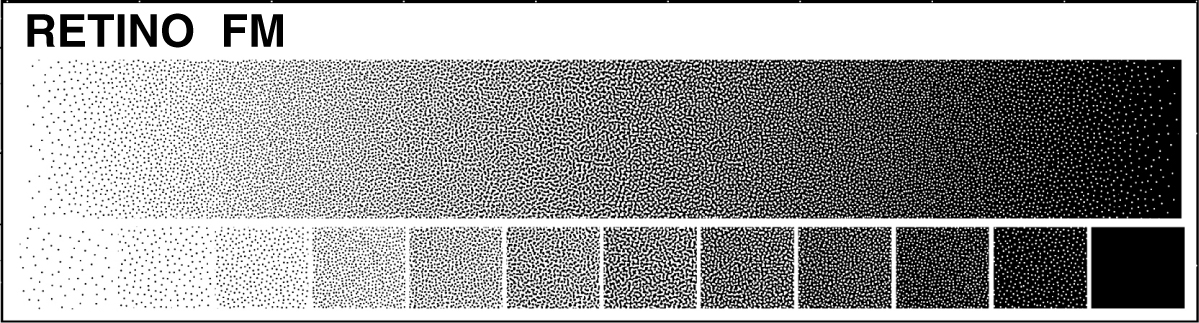
Magnified version of the same image.

Stochastic screening or FM screening is a halftone process based on pseudo-random distribution of halftone dots, using frequency modulation (FM) to change the density of dots according to the gray level desired. Traditional amplitude modulation halftone screening is based on a geometric and fixed spacing of dots, which vary in size depending on the tone color represented (for example, from 10 to 200 micrometres). The stochastic screening or FM screening instead uses a fixed size of dots (for example, about 25 micrometres) and a distribution density that varies depending on the color’s tone.

The strategy of stochastic screening, which has existed since the seventies, has had a revival in recent times thanks to increased use of computer-to-plate (CTP) techniques. In previous techniques, computer to film, during the exposure there could be a drastic variation in the quality of the plate. It was a very delicate and difficult procedure that was not much used. Today, with CTP during the creation of the plate you just need to check a few parameters on the density and tonal correction curve. When you make a plate with stochastic screening you must use a tone correction curve, this curve allows one to align the tone reproduction of an FM screen to that of an industry standard. Given the same final presswork tone value, an FM screen utilizes more halftone dots than an AM/XM screen. The result is that more light is filtered by the ink and less light simply reflects off the surface of the substrate. The result is that FM screens exhibit a greater color gamut than conventional AM/XM halftone screen frequencies. The creation of a plate with stochastic screening is done the same way as is done with an AM/XM screen. A tone reproduction compensation curve is typically applied to align the stochastic screening to conventional AM/FM tone reproductions targets (e.g. ISO 12647-2).

== Advantages ==
- The screening of four colors is no longer made with four different angles as with the traditional screen therefore it eliminates screening moiré.
- FM screening does not create rosette patterns.
- Halftone dot sizes can be as fine as 10 micrometres, which gives the product a quality comparable to that of photographic prints.
- The effects of misregistration are not completely eliminated, but the effect is certainly less apparent than in the traditional screening, this feature is very favorable for printing on rotary machines where the misregistration is very common due to effects such as web growth.
- The use of FM screening allowed Archant, a UK regional publisher, to switch to fonts with "tiny holes"; such an "eco-font" permitted a reduction in ink without turning fine text grainy.

== Disadvantages ==
The small dots used in FM screening require special care and cleanliness, especially when plates are made from films.
