= Wall printer =

Inkjet printer that can print on a wall

A wall printer, wall printing machine or direct-to-wall printer is a type of inkjet printer capable of printing on a flat, vertical surface, such as that of a wall or a billboard. Like other inkjet printers, a wall printer can be made to print vector graphics, raster graphics or both. Wall printers use a positioning control system to move print heads across large vertical areas, which enables printing logos, murals, text, and other artwork on indoor and outdoor walls. Surfaces compatible with wall printers include drywall, glass, brick, and cement.

== Design ==
=== Ink ===
A wall printer may be designed to use latex-based ink, which is durable, odourless and often used indoors; water-based ink, which costs less to produce; or ultraviolet-curable ink, which provides more resistance to abrasion and to exposure to sunlight and rainwater.

Traditional gravity-fed (siphon) ink delivery systems are being superseded by negative-pressure (vacuum-pressure) systems, which significantly improve operational reliability and print quality with modern print heads such as the Ricoh Gen 6.

=== Printer head ===
The print head is the same type as used in industrial inkjet printers. The most commonly used types are the Ricoh GH2220, Ricoh Gen 6, Epson i1600/i3200 and the now-obsolete Epson DX7. These are drop-on-demand print heads, either a single combined head shared by all colours or separate heads for each CMYK component (Cyan, Magenta, Yellow, Black) with maybe optional White. The printhead is responsible for transferring ink onto the surfaces to be printed. It achieves this by jetting tiny droplets of ink through the printer nozzles over a maximum throw distance of up to 4-20mm.

== Operation ==
The printhead moves vertically along a rail. To enable horizontal movement of the entire print head assembly, the rail together with the control system is mounted on a carriage with its own drive mechanism. The printer controls the movement of the entire assembly by several millimetres horizontally each time the printing printhead completes a full vertical pass. The speed of movement depends primarily on the selected print resolution (DPI) and print head speed. Maximum print height varies depending on the printer model and ranges from approximately 1.5 metres up to several metres. Although vertical wall printing can achieve designs that appear to extend from floor to ceiling, practical limitations apply: the printer typically cannot print within 30 cm of either the floor or ceiling, with smaller gaps around vertical obstructions such as doorways and pillars.

== Attributes ==
- Distance sensing ultrasonic/laser sensor – identifies wall flatness and ensures the print head keeps a safe distance from wall
- CMYK+W printheads – allow for double-sided printing on glass, as well as clear imagery on dark surfaces
- UV-LED lamp – instantly polymerizes the ink making it scratch-resistant and waterproof
- Vertical extension rails – to extend printing height
- Rubberised wheels enable precise lateral positioning of the printer along the wall, accurate to within a few millimetres.
- Horizontal rails: set the printer-wall standoff and ensure level tracking.
- Built-in computer with RIP software
- Ink containers with level sensors – permit ink refilling without interrupting the printer's operation
- Crosshair laser – for precise positioning, allowing for the seamless joining of two print runs
