= Press check =

Verifying color on press vs. color proof

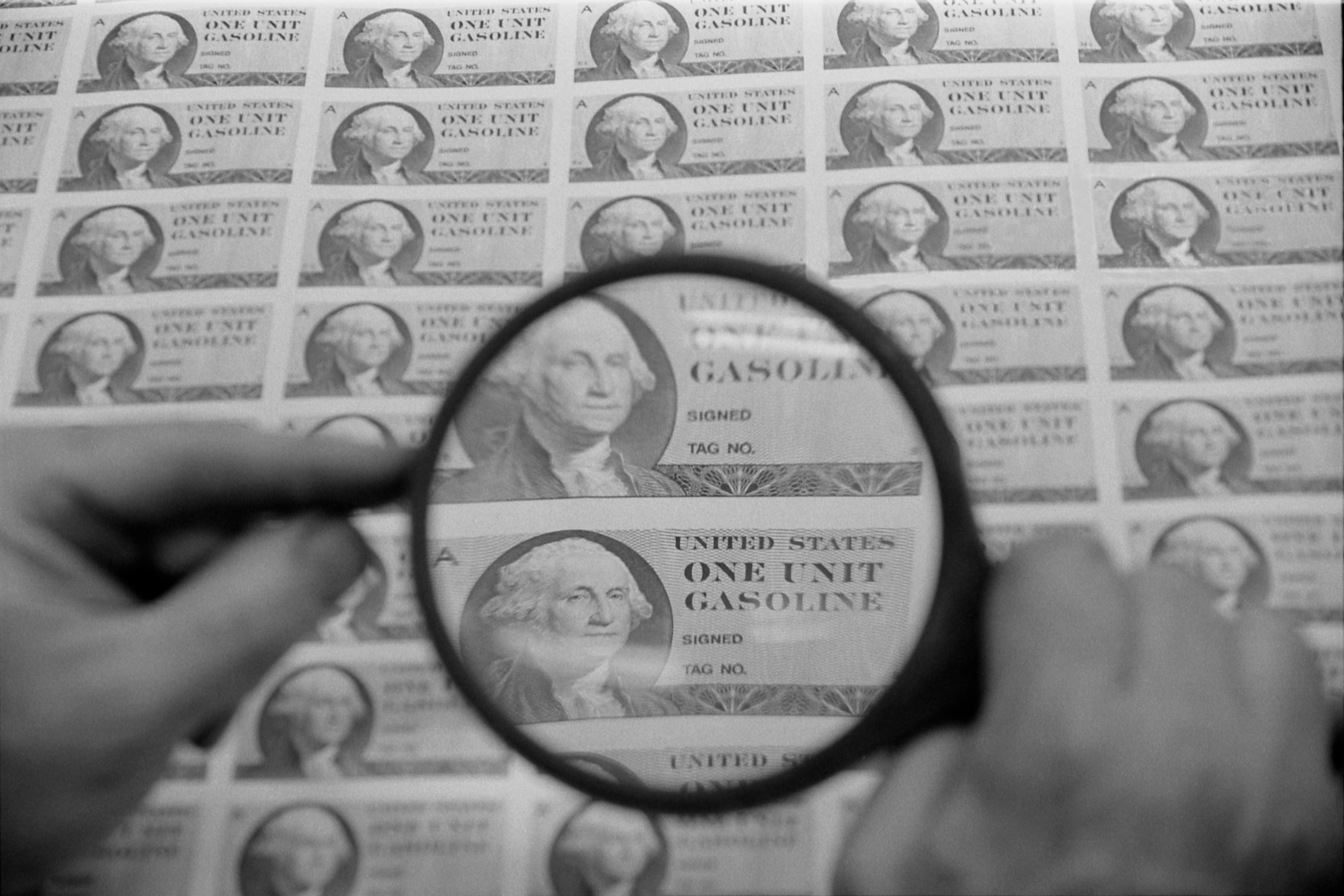
Gasoline ration stamps being inspected at the United States Bureau of Engraving and Printing in Washington, D.C.

The printing press check is a step in the printing process. It takes place after a printing press is set up but before the print run is underway.

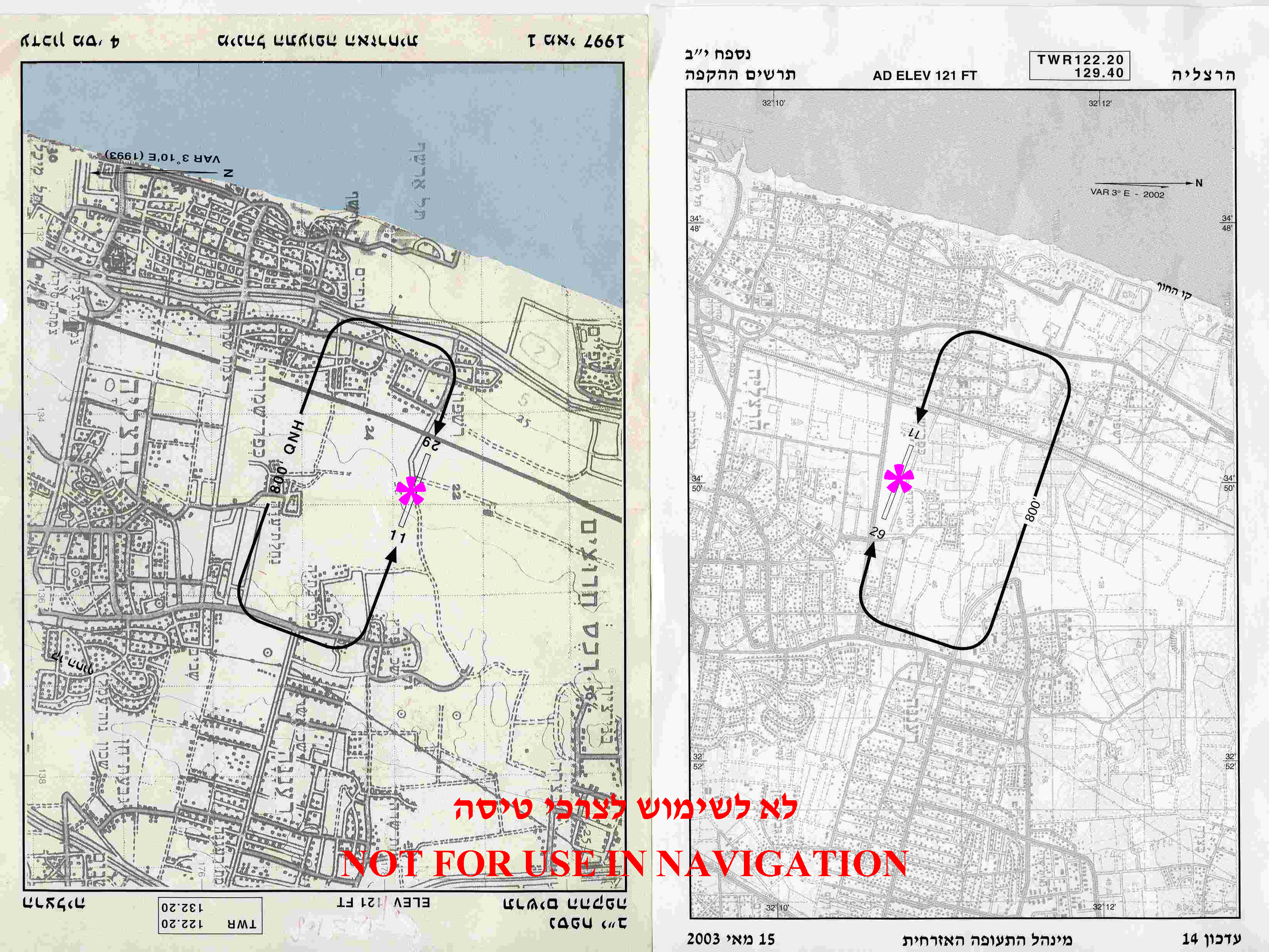
Herzliya Airport (Israel) Runway location and Traffic Pattern chart (left) was erroneously printed as a result of "black layer" 180° misplacement. The corrected chart is on the right.

While errors should be corrected during the Color Proofing and proofreading stages, the main purpose of a press check is to make sure that the color on press comes as close as possible to the color proof. Color proofs are valuable guides, but due to the inherent differences between color proofing techniques and printing itself, proofs will match the printed sheet with varying degrees of exactness. Beyond color, press checks allow verification that requested corrections and all proofed elements are present and correctly positioned.

Areas that are commonly evaluated at a press check are:

- Flesh tones or corporate logo match colors.
- Overall color balance across the sheet.
- Paper stock (checking for correct color, weight or texture).
- Content (looking for missing elements and confirming copy changes).
- Registration (checking sharpness, color overlapping, edges of images and screened type).
- Physical defects (checking for broken type, odd scratches, hickeys, spots or ghosting).

== Post press check ==
While some printing jobs are delivered as printed, most printing is usually not complete until it is converted into a "finished" product. Post press includes various types of finish work such as trimming, embossing, foiling, die-cutting, scoring, folding and bindery. Post press checking can include:

- Embossing: Defects that are commonly checked for are un-sharp edges, pinholes, ruptures and "halos" (shadows around the emboss).
- Foil stamping: Defects to be avoided are feathering, color changes, scuffing, peeling and un-sharp edges.
- Die-cutting: Defects that are commonly checked for are clean cutting and correct positioning.
- Folding/ Bindery: Before the printed sheets are folded or bound it is common to make and review a trimmed dummy of the finished piece. Defects that are commonly checked for are page order and alignment.

== See also ==
- Color printing
- Modern engraving
- Offset printing
- Pre-flight (printing)
- Prepress
