= Prepress =

Process in publishing

Prepress is the term used in the printing and publishing industries for the processes and procedures that occur between the creation of a print layout and the final printing. The prepress process includes the preparation of artwork for press, media selection, proofing, quality control checks and the production of printing plates if required. The artwork is quite often provided by the customer as a print-ready PDF file created in desktop publishing.

== Processes ==
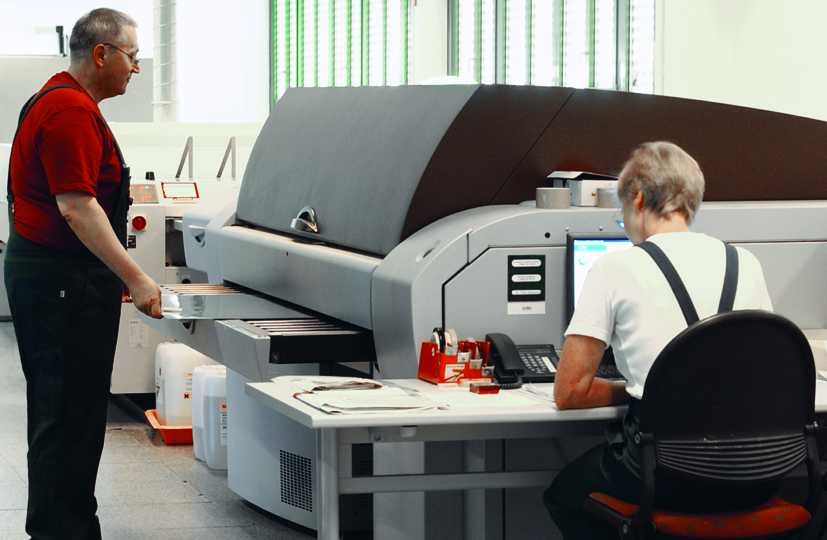
Digital prepress

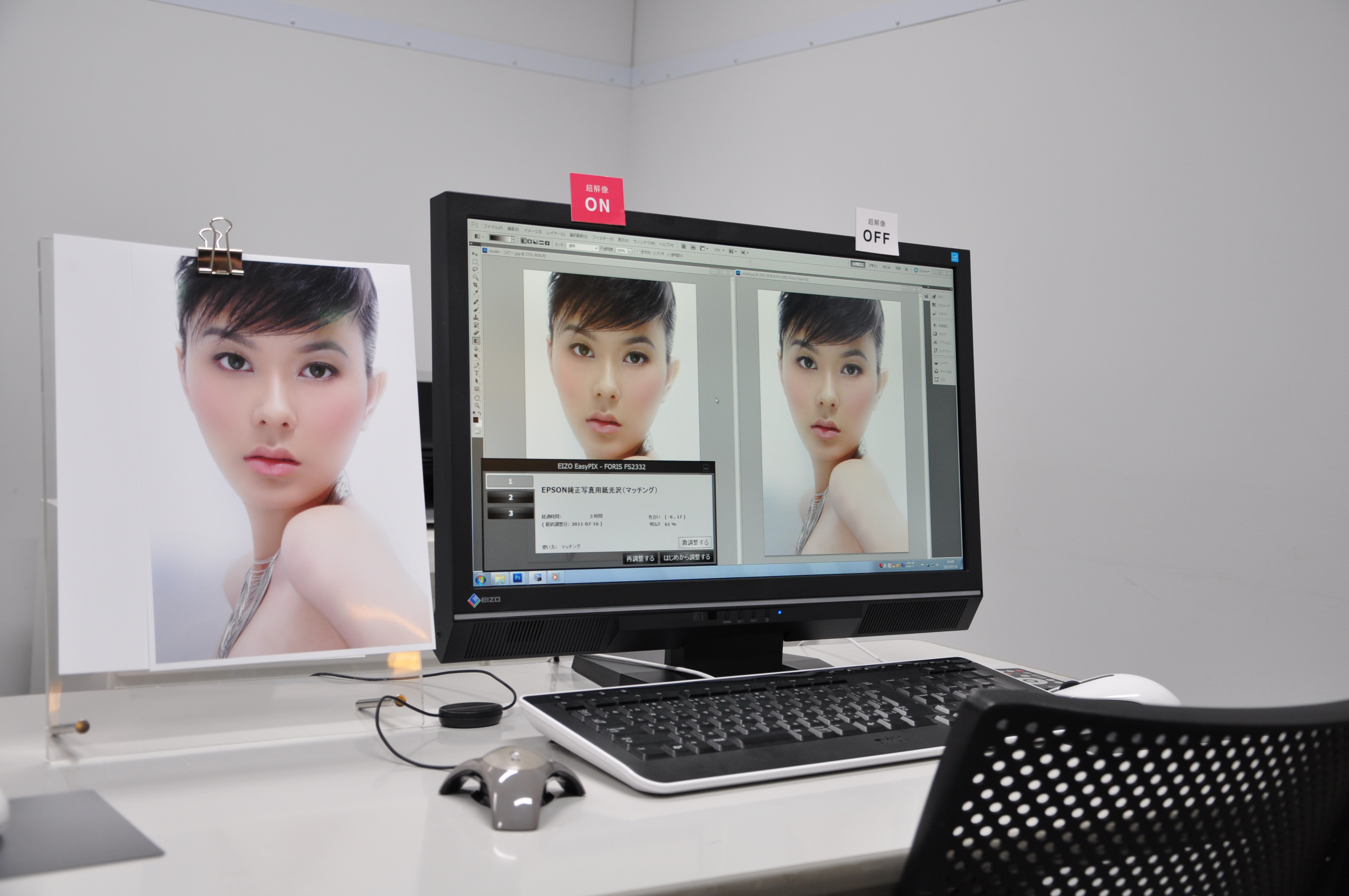
Color matching

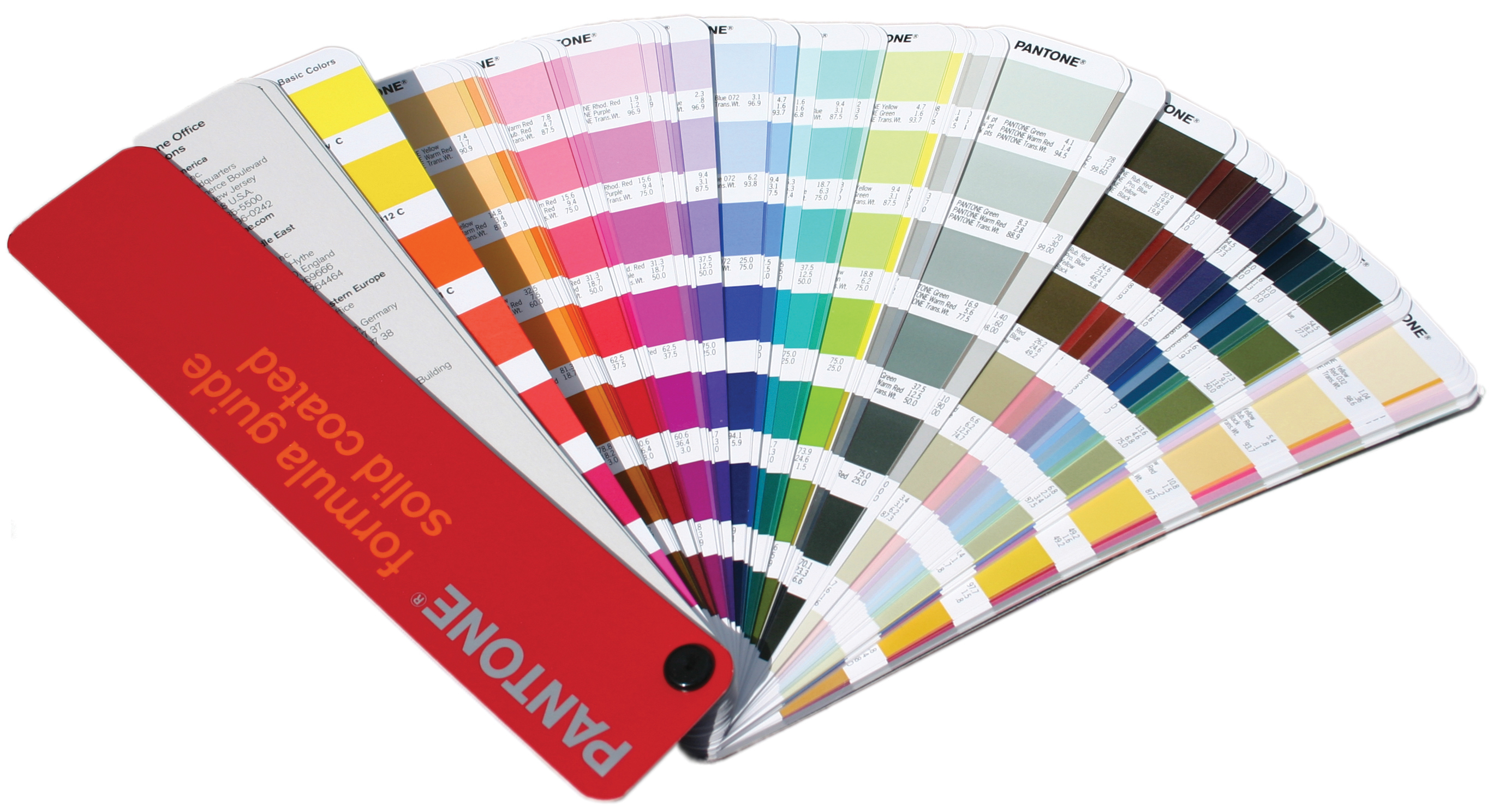
Color swatches

Imposition layout

1. Binding selection gives the customer multiple options for the spine of the publication such as Saddle-stitched, Perfect Bound or Case Bound, also Spiral, Wire and Comb binding are possible. Each has its merits and suits a particular number of pages.
2. Preparing artwork involves setting color profiles, bleed, registration and crop marks as specified by the printers, use spot colors, trapping and overprint as needed. Check transparency flattening results and allow for creep.
3. Pre-flight is an automatic scan of the document using the printers pre-defined profile to find errors before submitting.
4. Raster Image Processor (RIP) is the software/hardware that processes the print-ready files into a rasterized format that the printer can understand.
5. Proofing involves creating an accurate copy of the artwork before beginning production runs. This serves as a bond between the printer and their customer that the final product meets an agreed-upon standard. Proofs in general can be done for all parts (images, illustrations, text and colors) of the print product. In this part, three types of proofing should be checked and printed out: the print-ready PDF files, the printer's proof and the imposition proof. Print-ready PDF files should be made after the layout using preflight at the printing house. The printer's proof should be printed out in high resolution and checked by the customer. The imposition proof, which is usually done by the printers, should also be printed out to check and adjust the printing press.
6. Soft proofs are digital proofs that simulate accurately how the finished publication will look, intended to highlight any future issues.
7. Hard proofs are physically printed proofs that simulate accurately how the finished publication will look, intended to highlight any future issues.
8. A Contract Proof serves as the agreement between a customer and a printer which is signed-off before the printing can begin. This can be digitally signed as a digital contract using services like Acrobat Sign.
9. Quality control is performed throughout the prepress process but especially after the proofs are produced.
10. Imposition is the arrangement of the printed product’s pages on the printer’s sheet, in order to obtain faster printing, simplify binding and reduce paper waste.
11. Computer to plate (CTP) uses a laser to burn the image from a computer file onto a printing plate. Plates are made of different materials, depending on the needs of the printing method, usually Thermal, Photopolymer or Silver-Halogen (violet) plates are used. They usually have a processing stage in chemicals or liquid although process free plates are available.

In most modern publishing environments, the tasks related to content generation and refinement are carried out separately from other prepress tasks, and are commonly characterized as part of graphic design.

== Digital printing ==
Digital printing allows printing a lower volume or individually customised publications; this is also known as Variable Data Printing (VDP). Variable Data Printing starts with a static piece of artwork and has an element that changes which can be fed from a database, such as a customer's name. Conventional offset printing uses 4 printing plates for CMYK color publications making it only cost effective to print thousands of copies of each version. Digital printing is also cost effective for an individual publication with a fast turnaround. Toner cartridges or Inkjet Cartridges are used making them easy to operate and maintain. Advanced machines have options for additional spot colors with special inks such as metallic, fluorescent and white.

== Color management ==
Managing color across the process involves having the right equipment and taking regular measurements. One needs wide color gamut monitors that can best replicate a CMYK color space and have been calibrated. Pantone swatch guides are needed for color matching. A professional color profiling system like the ones listed at the International Color Consortium (ICC) and using ICC color profiles are required. Spectrophotometers to validate the color of the CMYK ink and spot colors are also important in prepress.

== Quality control ==
Images in a print-ready PDF should be uploaded at 300dpi resolution. Any vector artwork or text should stay vector including clipping paths embedded in images for cutouts, as the RIP will rasterize them at 2400dpi, it can take about 10gb of data to create the rasterized image for the printing plates. Text and vector can print at 2400dpi if it only uses one solid color as there will be no halftone dithering, that's why magazine text is so sharp. Images can only print at the equivalent of 300dpi because of the dithering needed for the gradients and mixed colors, although the dithering of the image is printed at 2400dpi (300dpi for images, and 2400dpi for text and vector are typical values stated by printers).

All artwork should be checked for imperfections in resolution, embedded fonts, color profiles, printers marks and any obvious mistakes that were missed during the writing, design, editing or proofreading stages, although prepress are not accountable as the artwork should already be agreed as print-ready.

== Digital workflow ==
Key prepress digital workflow software products include: Agfa Apogee, Fujifilm XMF, Heidelberg Prinect, Kodak Prinergy and Fiery Workflow Suite. Important features when choosing digital workflow software or cloud submission and proofing software include: A version control system that helps you keep track of who is changing what and when. A secure system that lets different people check in and check out files and records when they do so. A method to lock down files currently in use to prevent simultaneous modifications by others. A way to lock out files so that only particular people can open them and change them, but anyone can view them.

== History ==
During the 1980s and 1990s, computer-aided prepress techniques began to supplant the traditional dark room and light table processes, and by the early 2000s the word prepress became, in some ways, synonymous with digital pre-press. Immediately before the mainstream introduction of computers to the process, much of the industry was using large format cameras to make emulsion-based (film) copies of text and images. This film was then assembled (planning (UK) or stripping) and used to expose another layer of emulsion on a plate, thus copying images from one emulsion to another. This method is still used; however, as digital pre-press technology has become less cost intensive, more efficient and reliable, and as the knowledge and skill required to use the new hardware and especially software have become more widespread within the labor force, digital automation has been introduced to almost every part of the process. Some topics related to digital but not analog prepress include preflighting (verifying the presence, quality and format of each digital component), color management, and RIPing.

PDF workflows also became predominant. Vendors of Prepress systems, in addition to the offset printing industry, embraced a subset of the PDF format referred to as PDF/X1-a. This industry specific subset is one version of the PDF/X (PDF for eXchange) set of standards.

In more recent years, prepress software has been developed which is designed to find as many efficiencies in prepress workflow as possible. These tools are accessed online, and allow different workers to work on one project at the same time, often from different locations. Key functionality automates common steps to reduce errors, reinforce quality standards and speed up production. Examples include automatically re-folioing pages, digital dummies for soft proofs, live linking with Adobe InDesign and pre-flight checking. These tools revolve around a Flatplan and are used in all sorts of prepress including book, magazine and catalog production.

== See also ==
- Die Cutting
- UV Varnish
- Foil Printing
- Embossing
- Lamination
- Metallic Ink
- Fluorescent Ink
- Perforation
- Brochure
- Folded Leaflet
- Flyer
- Dot Gain
- Halftone
- Lithography
- Screen Printing
- Loupe
