= Creo (company) =

Software company in Canada

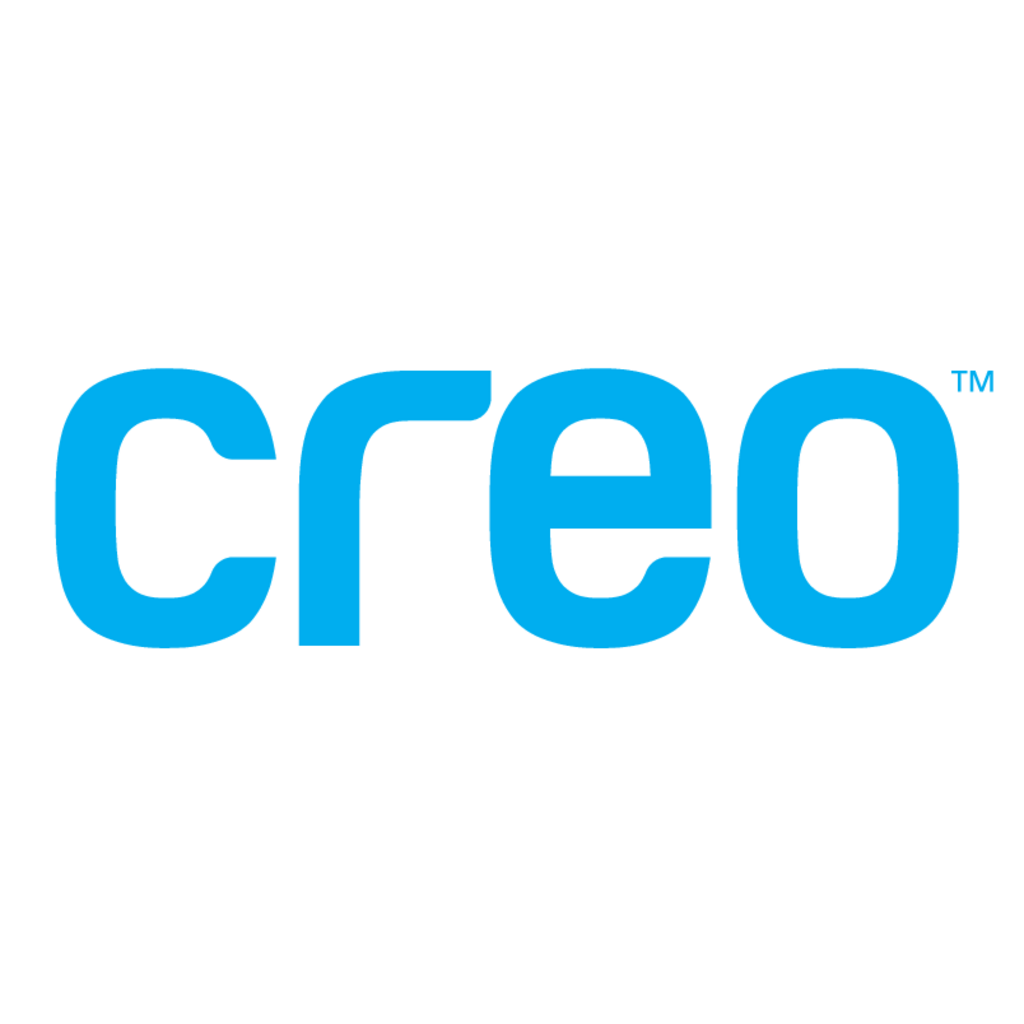
- Founded: 1983
- Founder: Dan Gelbart
- Successor: Kodak
- Headquarters: Burnaby, British Columbia
- Products: Prinergy; Prinergy Evo; InSite

Creo, now part of Eastman Kodak Company, was a Burnaby, British Columbia, Canada-based company, involved in imaging and software technology for computer to plate and digital printing. The name derives from the Latin creo, "I create."

Creo was founded in 1983 and acquired by Kodak 22 years later on January 31, 2005.

In its current incarnation, Kodak Digital Printing Solutions Group manufactures printing plates, professional digital cameras, colour and copydot scanning systems; inkjet, drop-on-demand, and digital halftone proofers; workflow management software; variable information workflow systems; and computer-to-film and computer-to-plate devices..

== Creo Inc. ==
Prior to acquisition by Kodak, Creo had over 4,200 employees spread over five sites in the Greater Vancouver area, with three in the Burnaby area and two facilities in Delta, BC. Creo and was initially a manufacturer of optical tape recorder (OTR) devices and a vendor of laser imaging engines to the printing industry. Some of Creo's main products are Prinergy, Prinergy Evo and InSite, a prepress workflow and file processing system. In 2000, it acquired the worldwide graphic arts operations of Scitex, based out of Israel. A more detailed history is published by International Directory of Company Histories.

=== Leadership ===
Creo was founded in 1983 by Dan Gelbart (who retired from Kodak in 2007, two years after acquisition) and Ken Spencer (who retired from Creo in the 1990s, prior to acquisition). Amos Michelson was the CEO from 1995 until it was sold to Kodak in 2005.
