= Flatplan =

The flatplan is a page plan of a publication that shows how the articles and adverts are laid out.

== The flatplanning process ==
A flatplan shows where all articles and adverts are laid out, and in what order. It allows complete control of the publication production process avoiding confusion. Without a flatplan, the production director and advertisement director struggle to control which pages go where. This makes signing off a publication very difficult and time-consuming.

Flatplans started life drawn out on pieces of paper stuck to the wall of the production team. As pages moved around, and advertisements were booked (and cancelled) the pages were annotated and amended.

Nowadays, paper flatplans are being replaced by digital flatplans. These systems link the data in a flatplan with other systems. Many synchronise with Adobe InDesign updating with the most recent version of the artwork for each page as the designer is working on it. Other examples include linking to ad booking systems where copy chasing is automated. Increasingly, such systems sit at the centre of the prepress workflow.
