= Dot gain =

Phenomenon in offset lithography

Dot gain, or tonal value increase, is a phenomenon in physical printing processes including offset lithography, flexography and gravure that causes printed material to look darker than intended. It is caused by halftone dots growing in area between the original printing film and the final printed result. In practice, this means that an image that has not been adjusted to account for dot gain will appear too dark when it is printed. Dot gain calculations are often an important part of a CMYK color model.

== Definition ==
Dot gain is defined as the increase in the area fraction (of the inked or colored region) of a halftone dot during the prepress and printing processes. Total dot gain is the difference between the dot size on the film negative and the corresponding printed dot size. For example, a dot pattern that covers 30% of the image area on film, but covers 50% when printed, is said to show a total dot gain of 20%.

However, with today's computer-to-plate imaging systems, which eliminates film completely, the measure of "film" is the original digital source "dot". Therefore, dot gain is now measured as the original digital dot versus the actual measured ink dot on paper.

Mathematically, dot gain is defined as:

$$DG=a_{\text{print}}-a_{\text{form}}$$

where a_{print} is the ink area fraction of the print, and a_{form} is the prepress area fraction to be inked. The latter may be the fraction of opaque material on a film positive (or transparent material on a film negative), or the relative command value in a digital prepress system.

== Causes ==
Dot gain is caused by ink spreading around halftone dots. Several factors can contribute to the increase in halftone dot area. Different paper types have different ink absorption rates; uncoated papers can absorb more ink than coated ones, and thus can show more gain. As printing pressure can squeeze the ink out of its dot shape causing gain, ink viscosity is a contributing factor with coated papers; higher viscosity inks can resist the pressure better. Halftone dots can also be surrounded by a small circumference of ink, in an effect called "rimming". Each halftone dot has a microscopic relief, and ink will fall off the edge before being eliminated entirely by the fountain solution (in the case of offset printing). Finally, halation of the printing film during exposure can contribute to dot gain.

== Yule–Nielsen effect and "optical dot gain" ==
The Yule–Nielsen effect, sometimes known as optical dot gain, is a phenomenon caused by absorption and scattering of light by the substrate. Light becomes diffused around dots, darkening the apparent tone. As a result, dots absorb more light than their size would suggest.

The Yule–Nielsen effect is not strictly speaking a type of dot gain, because the size of the dot does not change, just its relative absorbance. Some densitometers automatically compute the absorption of a halftone relative to the absorption of a solid print using the Murray–Davies formula.

== Controlling dot gain ==
Not all halftone dots show the same amount of gain. The area of greatest gain is in midtones (40–60%); above this, as the dots contact one another, the perimeter available for dot gain is reduced. Dot gain becomes more noticeable with finer screen ruling, and is one of the factors affecting the choice of screen.

Dot gain can be measured using a densitometer and color bars in absolute percentages. Dot gain is usually measured with 40% and 80% tones as reference values. A common value for dot gain is around 23% in the 40% tone for a 150 lines per inch screen and coated paper. Thus a dot gain of 19% means that a tint area of 40% will result in a 59% tone in the actual print.

Modern prepress software usually includes utility to achieve the desired dot gain values using special compensation curves for each machine -- a tone reproduction curve (TRC).

== Computing the area of a halftone pattern ==
The inked area (coverage) fraction of the dot may be computed using the Yule-Nielsen model. This requires the optical densities of the substrate, the solid-covered area, and the halftone tint, as well as the value of the Yule-Nielsen parameter, n. Pearson has suggested a value of 1.7 be used in absence of more specific information. However, it will tend to be larger when the halftone pattern in finer and when the substrate has a wider point spread function.

== Models for dot gain ==
Another factor upon which dot gain depends is the dot's area fraction. Dots with relatively large perimeters will tend to have greater dot gain than dots with smaller perimeters. This makes it useful to have a model for the amount of dot gain as a function of prepress dot area fraction.

=== An early model ===
Tollenaar and Ernst tacitly suggested a model in their 1963 IARIGAI paper. It was

$$\mathrm{gain}_{\mathit{TE}}=a_{\mathrm{form}} \,\left(1 - a_{\mathit{vf}}\right)$$

where a_{vf}, the shadow critical area fraction, is the area fraction on the form at which the halftone pattern just appears solid on the print. This model, while simple, has dots with relatively small perimeter (in the shadows) exhibiting greater gain than dots with relatively larger perimeter (in the midtones).

=== Haller's model ===
Karl Haller, of FOGRA in Munich, proposed a different model, one in which dots with larger perimeters tended to exhibit greater dot gain than those with smaller perimeters. One result derivable from his work is that dot gains depend on the shape of the halftone dots.

=== The GRL model ===
Viggiano suggested an alternate model, based on the radius (or other fundamental dimension) of the dot growing in relative proportion to the perimeter of the dot, with empirical correction the duplicated areas which result when the corners of adjacent dots join. Mathematically, his model is:

$$\mathrm{gain}_{\mathit{GRL}}=\begin{cases}
a_{\mathrm{form}}-a_{\mathit{wf}}, & \mathrm{for}\  a_{\mathrm{form}}\leq a_{\mathit{wf}}\\[6pt]
2\,\Delta_{0,50}\sqrt{a_{\mathrm{form}}\left(1-a_{\mathrm{form}}\right)}, & \mathrm{for}\  a_{\mathit{wf}}<a_{\mathrm{form}}<a_{\mathit{vf}}\\[6pt]
a_{\mathrm{form}}-a_{\mathit{vf}}, & \mathrm{for}\  a_{\mathrm{form}}\geq a_{\mathit{vf}}\end{cases}$$

where Δ_{0,50} is the dot gain when the input area fraction is 1/2; the highlight critical printing area, a_{wf}, is computed as:

$$a_{\mathit{wf}}=\begin{cases}
\dfrac{4\Delta_{0,50}^{2}}{1+4\Delta_{0,50}^{2}}, & \mathrm{for}\ \Delta_{0,50}<0\\[6pt]
0, & \mathrm{for}\ \Delta_{0,50}\geq0\end{cases}$$

and the shadow critical printing area, a_{vf}, is computed according to

$$a_{\mathit{vf}}=\begin{cases}
1, & \mathrm{for}\ \Delta_{0,50}\leq0\\[6pt]
\dfrac{1}{1+4\Delta_{0,50}^{2}}, & \mathrm{for}\ \Delta_{0,50}>0\end{cases}$$

Note that, unless Δ_{0,50} = 0, either the highlight critical printing fraction, a_{wf}, will be nonzero, or the shadow critical printing fraction, a_{vf} will not be 1, depending on the sign of Δ_{0,50}. In instances in which both critical printing fractions are non-trivial, Viggiano recommended that a cascade of two (or possibly more) applications of the dot gain model be applied.

=== Empirical models ===
Sometimes the exact form of a dot gain curve is difficult to model on the basis of geometry, and empirical modeling is used instead. To a certain extent, the models described above are empirical, as their parameters cannot be accurately determined from physical aspects of image microstructure and first principles. However, polynomials, cubic splines, and interpolation are completely empirical, and do not involve any image-related parameters. Such models were used by Pearson and Pobboravsky, for example, in their program to compute dot area fractions needed to produce a particular color in lithography.
