= Online proofing =

Online automation of review and approval

Online proofing is the process undertaken by web designers, photographers, marketing teams, creative agencies, and video production companies, among others, to automate the review and approval of work online. Traditionally a process used by photographers, as more work is done online and teams work remotely this method of working allows people to collaboratively work together to speed up the design process and keep an online audit trail.

Online proofing has also become widespread in the e-commerce industry. With the growing capabilities of the internet, companies who allow their customers to design and customize a product on their website have adopted the online proofing process as an effective quality assurance method. Online proofing saves time in the purchasing process and improves customer buying experience and raises customer satisfaction.

Online proofing software makes the process of sharing creative feedback fast and clear. It allows reviewers to annotate creative files directly for clearer, contextual feedback. Creative project managers can also track every feedback comment and asset version in one place for faster sign-offs.

== See also ==
- Collaborative software
- Digital asset management
- Online artwork proofing, feedback, review and approval tool
- Prepress proofing
