= Optical tape =

Medium for optical storage

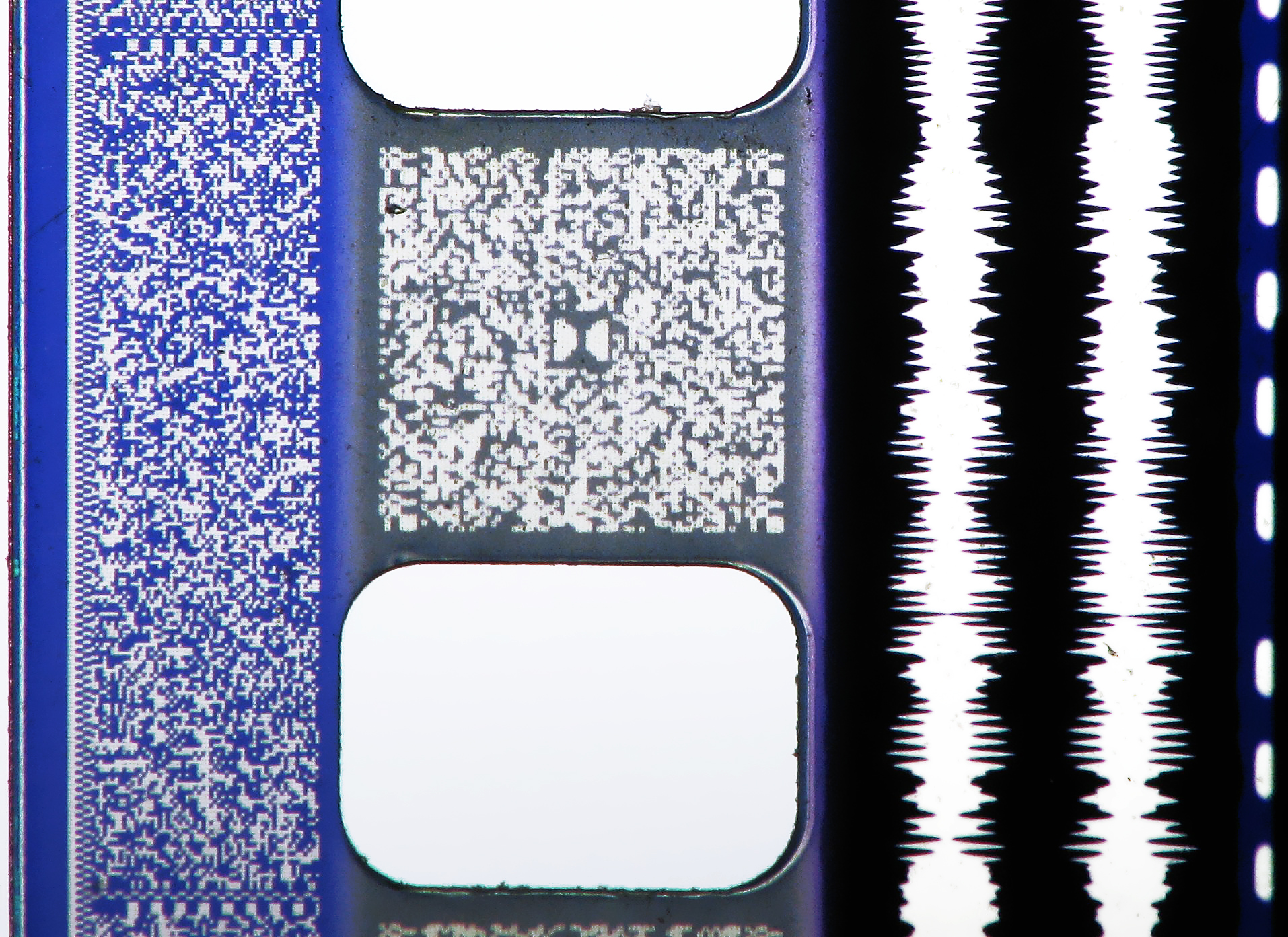
Cinema film stock showing two digital audio formats (Blue:SDDS, Grey:DD) plus the traditional analog audio tracks. While not strictly an optical tape format, it is very similar.

Optical tape is a medium for optical storage generally consisting of a long and narrow strip of plastic onto which patterns can be written and from which the patterns can be read back. It shares some technologies with cinema film stock and optical discs, but is compatible with neither. In the 1990s, it was projected that optical tape would be a commonly used, high-capacity, high-speed computer data storage format. At least one working system and several prototypes were developed, but as of 2007, none of these technologies are widely used.

The primary motivation behind developing this technology was the possibility of far greater storage capacities than either magnetic tape or optical discs. For example, the goal of the LOTS project in 1995 was to "achieve a data-transfer rate of at least 100 megabytes per second (MB/s) to store more than 1 terabyte on the IBM cartridge", as well as an average access time of 10 seconds; at the time, these specifications were significantly superior to its primary competitor, magnetic tape, which only stored about 10–50 gigabytes per cartridge and had a data-transfer rate of about 15 MB/s. It was also considered more durable than magnetic tape, since it is not vulnerable to magnetic fields and is read by lasers instead of physical contact with a magnetic head.

== See also ==
- Creo — Former manufacturer of Optical tape recorders, now a part of Kodak.
- TRAAMS (Tape-based Rapid Access Affordable Mass Storage) — An optical tape technology developed by a consortium led by Terabank, Inc..
- LOTS (Laser Optical Tape Storage) — Another optical tape technology developed by LOTS Technology, Inc.
