= Prinergy =

Prepress workflow software by Creo

- Original author: Creo
- Developer: Kodak
- Initial release: 1999
- Stable release: 8.4.0 / Q4 2019
- Operating system: Microsoft Windows
- Platform: Client–server
- Type: Prepress workflow system
- License: Proprietary

Prinergy is a prepress workflow system created by Creo in 1999 and maintained and sold through Kodak. It is a client/server system that integrates PDF creation, job proofing, imposition, and a raster image processor (RIP) into one unified workflow.

== History ==
Creo was the leading manufacturer of computer-to-plate technology in the 1990s, using thermal laser technology to capture a significant market share of the offset prepress industry. Because computer to plate technology allowed printers to image large numbers of plates at great speed, there arose a corresponding need to engineer a workflow that could process large amounts of data to feed the platemakers and ultimately the offset presses.

Prinergy was code-named Araxi (a restaurant in Whistler, British Columbia) when it was conceived of in 1995, on a train trip returning from Düsseldorf after Drupa 1995. The Prinergy product name was chosen a few months before the product was launched. The name was created by namebase, based on a fusion of "Print" and "Energy."

In 1997 Creo and Heidelberg formed a joint venture to cooperate in the sales of computer to plate (CTP) systems. The software groups aligned to bring their previous workflow products together under a common development, and included components including color management and trapping derived from the DaVinci product line. The joint venture was dissolved in 2000, as a consequence of Creo's acquisition of Scitex Inc.

Prinergy 1.0 was introduced at Seybold in 1999. Prinergy 3.1 released in 2006, Prinergy 4. was released in 2009, Prinergy 5.1 was released in 2011, Prinergy 5.3 was released in 2012, Prinergy 6.0 was demonstrated at Drupa 2012 and released in 2013, Version 7.0 was released at 2015, Version 7.5 was released in 2016, Version 8.3 in Q4 2018 and Versions 8.4.0 in Q4 2019. In January 2025, Prinergy version 11.0 was released, which introduced enhancements to Rules-Based Automation (RBA), usability of the Virtual Proofing Software Plus (VPS+), and direct connectivity to Kodak Prosper presses.

== Function ==
The Prinergy system was designed from the ground up to automatically perform all functions on the data that are necessary to take a digital file through a series of workflow steps to produce a master plate, any one of offset, gravure, or flexo. The pages for a job are first processed (normalized) with sanity checks to ensure it will not cause the RIP to fail at later stages. Then it is color-managed, meaning that the necessary color management and ICC profiles are attached to images and text. Then it is "trapped"; where colors join in a document, a slight overlap is created so that white space does not show on printing due to minute registration errors.

After the Postscript or PDF is processed (refined) into the system, the operator has the option of a number of choices including sending single pages out to a proofer or impose the pages into a signature for platemaking.

Virtually all Flexographic, offset and digital packaging, and offset commercial printers of the world (e.g. R.R.Donnelley, Quebecor, Mohn Media, Quad Graphics) use Prinergy as their central workflow management system, as well as thousands of smaller sheetfed offset printers.

All job information and file metadata are stored in an Oracle database, while content is stored as Adobe PDF or PDF/X, and production control is stored as Adobe Portable Job Ticket Format, or Job Definition Format (JDF). Prinergy also has archival and retrieval capabilities.
