= Prepress proofing =

Method of verification before the final press run

A contract proof usually serves as an agreement between customer and printer and as a color reference guide for adjusting the press before the final press run. Most contract proofs are a prepress proof.

The primary goal of 'proofing' is to serve as a tool for customer verification that the entire job is accurate. Prepress proofing (also known as off-press proofing) is a cost-effective way of providing a visual copy without the expense of creating a press proof. If errors are found during the printing process on press, correcting them can prove very costly to one or both parties involved.

Press time is the most expensive part of print media. The main objective of proofing is to produce either a soft or hard copy of what the final product will look like on press. Hard-copy proofing usually involves ink-jet printing or other technologies (i.e. Laminate Proof) to produce high-quality one-off copies of the production artwork. Soft proofing usually involves highly color accurate wide-gamut computer displays. Additional proofing methods may reduce the risk of prepress errors and reprints.

The printed proof is a simulation of the possible output – a CMYK press sheet. In the best conditions, the proofing process will try to emulate the effects of the printing press through color management and screening techniques, which can be quite challenging as proofing machines may behave differently compared to normal press machines.

== History ==
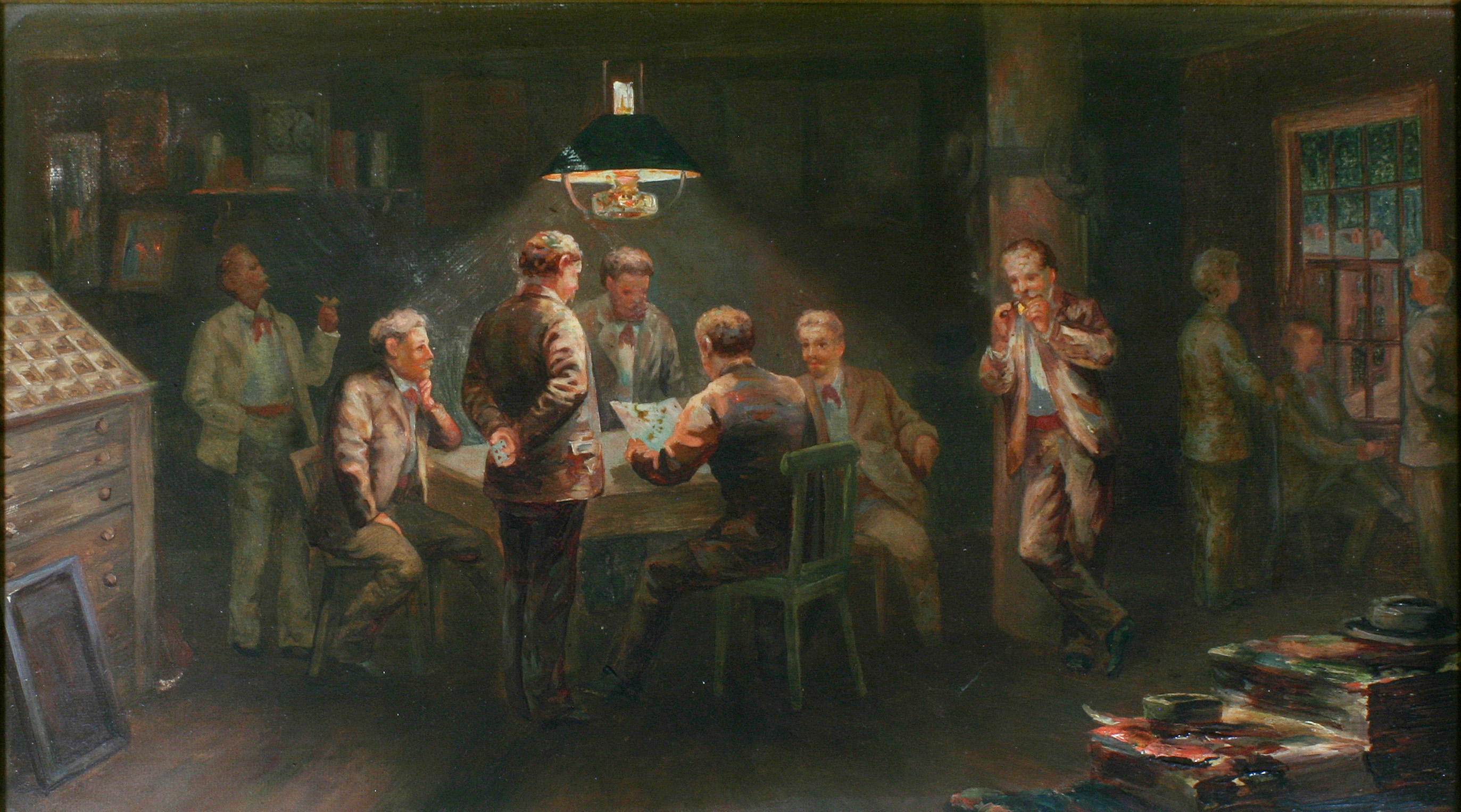
A fussy client approves a press proof, in a 19th century painting.

Since the first days of Johannes Gutenberg, proofing has just been press proofs – one makes a short run on the press in order to verify what is to be done on a production run. While technology evolved to lower the per-copy cost of a printing job, the cost of starting a production run continued to rise. Today, it can be very costly to start up a production press, and thus it is cost-prohibitive to run a press proof. While some people may think a press proof is the ultimate proof quality, this is not necessarily so, especially if the production run is done days or weeks later when press conditions may have changed, or the production run is done on a different press than the press proof.

In the late 1940s, the first overlay systems were developed. These systems produce each of the process colors on a separate sheet of clear film and then register them together to view the final proof.

The Ozalid division of General Aniline and Film (GAF) Corporation created Ozachrome as the first commercial system used in proofing. Diazo (light-sensitive dye) coatings on film were used for each of the process colors, and the films were developed using ammonia vapor. The initial process colors used were red, yellow, blue and black, although other colors may have been used in subsequent years. A black separation was processed on a white paper, while the remaining separations were processed on clear cellulose acetate.

Around 1965, 3M invented an overlay system called Color Key. Basically, sheets of clear polyester were coated with UV-sensitive pigmented emulsions in the four process colors, cyan, magenta, yellow and black. Later, spot colors were created (Color Key Custom Colors). The sheets were exposed to the artwork via a carbon arc lamp, washed with water and process chemicals, and then dried.

As of 2010, overlay proofs are still created, for example for small single-drum presses where each color has to be a separate run. Such proofs are usually made using either inkjet printers or lamination devices.

Internal (single-sheet) or laminate systems attempt to overcome the problems with overlay systems by putting all process colors on a single sheet of media. After the end of World War II, the first commercial system, called Watercote, was introduced by the Direct Reproduction Corporation.

By the 1970s, 3M developed Transfer Key technology, which used a cold lamination adhesive process. Successive layers of colored adhesive would be pressed on the substrate, exposed and washed away until all the colors existed on a single substrate. This later evolved into the Match Print product, which used a thermal transfer lamination process. The Match Print trade mark has since been sold to Kodak, which uses it today in its MATCHPRINT InkJet and MATCHPRINT Virtual products. Both Color Key and Match Print have also become generic names for types of prepress proofs. Later, other similar water process products such as DuPont Waterproof came on the market.

In the early 1960s, several attempts were made to develop electrophotographic proofing processes based on the electrofax principle, using paper coated with zinc oxide in a resistive binder as a photoconductor, along with toners consisting of ink pigments dispersed in liquid isopar. The electrofax principle was introduced in the United States by RCA, and the use of liquid toners was developed in Australia by Ralph Metcalf and Robert Wright of the Australian government. Other groups worked on similar processes, but these never got to market.

Later in the 1970s, toner-based solutions such as Dupont Cromalin were developed.

By the 1980s, custom colors, including white and metallics such as gold and silver, were becoming commonplace.

The first Iris printer, the model 2044, was developed in 1985 and first sold commercially in December 1985. This was a continuous stream inkjet printer that was later followed by the Veris printer in 2004. Initially, these printers had unparalleled quality in inkjet printing, but steady advances in drop-on-demand printers has made their quality acceptable to more and more prepress shops. As of 2010, both Iris and Veris devices are still in use.

In the early 1990s, dye sublimation was introduced with products like the 3M Rainbow and Kodak DCP9000 and DCP9500.

Also in the early 1990s, laser sublimation systems were introduced. Products such as the Fuji FINALPROOF, and Kodak Approval are still in use today.

In the late 1990s, laser thermal transfer was developed. These systems are still in use, such as the Creo (now Kodak) Spectrum. The Spectrum was notable in that the same platesetter device used to make plates was also used to make proofs, resulting in proofs with identical screening as the press.

By 2005, the first spectrophotometers were integrated with inkjet printers, such as the Creo Veris and HP 2100. By 2009, Epson released a printer with an integrated spectrophotometer. By automating the measurement process, this eliminates much of the labor involved in calibrating the proofing system and validating the proofs. However, it slows down overall throughput of the proofing device, so more proofing devices are needed to maintain throughput.

By 2003, soft proofing emerged using well-calibrated and profiled computer displays under highly controlled viewing conditions. This approach continues to gain in popularity due to the much lower cost and lesser production time than producing a hard-copy proof.

As of 2010, the majority of hard-copy contract proofing is done on inkjet and laminate devices, while soft proofing continues to gain popularity.

Since the late 1990s, a number of software proofing solutions were developed by companies. Previously, proofing systems were typically a complete solution from one vendor, but as software has become the dominant enabling technology in proofing, customers enjoy the benefits of being able to use commodity print devices over special proofing devices.

== Proofing methods ==
Depending on the quality needed and the use of product, there are two major types of proof:

- soft proof;
- hard proof;

=== Soft proof ===
Soft proof describes the simulation of the print result on a monitor. This is the cheapest solution for proofing since no additional equipment, except a monitor, is needed.

Usually soft proof is done in software applications in combination with color management systems. The monitor used for soft proofing must be calibrated, so that the image on the screen looks like the image on the paper. The major problem is the difference of color spaces (RGB in monitor and CMYK in print), and this is solved by using ICC profiles for input and output devices. Moreover, colors on a monitor depend not only on its properties, but also on lighting conditions in a room where the image is viewed. Usually, lighting is standardized and is close to a daylight (D50 or D65).

Soft proofing can be used an unlimited number of times, and is most useful when editing images and designing layout, but is normally not used as a contract proof.

The use of soft proofs in low end printing has become prevalent in recent years allowing for a time and cost savings where color management is not crucial. A PDF soft proof is commonly used for preliminary layout verification.

=== Hard proof ===
Hard proof is an actual printed sample of a printed product. It is further divided into five general classifications

Blueprint (originated from conventional platemaking) is a copy printed in one color and used for checking and correcting mistakes in contents, imposition layout and completeness of data.

Imposition proof (Layout proof) is similar to blueprint, but the copy is printed in color. Imposition proof is usually done with a large-format color inkjet printer.

Color proof (Color digital proof) provides the color-reliable/color-true reproduction of the contents of the file intended for printing. Color proof is made with inkjet printers or thermal sublimation printers in combination with powerful color-management systems. Proofing is usually performed in full-size format, but in some cases small-page format is also acceptable. Color proof serves as a guideline for a printing press operator, and usually stands for a contract proof.

Screen proof (True proof) is a method of proofing used for simulating a raster structure of the printed image. Performing this proof makes it possible to recognize different raster-dependent effects such as smoothness, grade and range of tonal gradations, and moiré or rosette patterns.

Several vendors offer special proof systems for creating a screen proof. The proof is produced via color donors and thermal transfer (ablation) onto intermediate carriers or onto the substrate used for the print run. Both systems are imagesetter-like devices with which the image motifs can be reproduced in every detail including their color, screen definition, and screen angles. The true proof systems use color foils that are to be processed in separate units (laminators), transferred from intermediate carriers onto production paper and/or laminated, either to protect the proof or to give it the appearance of the surface structure of production paper.

Press proof (Product proof) is a test print of the data directly on a printing press. This can be the press for the production run or a comparable press (using the same print technology) prepared especially for proof purposes. Short runs of 50 or 100 copies can be produced more cost-effectively than with other color proof processes. The individual proof is, however, hardly economically justifiable.

== Issues ==
Proofing can either be viewed subjectively as an art based on training, experience, talent and judgment; or objectively as a science based on measurement, algorithms, and analysis; but in practice it is somewhere in between. Increasingly, however, printers rely on scientific methods, as it is often more cost-effective to buy the necessary technology than to acquire, train and retain skilled artisans.

In many cases, it makes sense to align the proof with the press, but in other cases it makes sense to align the press with the proof. Typically, one would align the press with the proof when one is trying to achieve a particular industry specification (i.e. Fogra, GRACoL, SWOP, etc.). In situations where one is trying to achieve the best possible color on a particular press, typically to distinguish oneself as a printer, one would define a custom color standard for the press and then align the proof with the press.

=== Process control ===
A central aspect of scientific proofing is process control, which consists of baselining, characterizing and calibrating the proofing process.

A baseline is representation of the output device settings (i.e. paper feed, head alignment, etc.) and associated conditions (i.e. media, ink, screening, etc.). A baseline is created by adjusting device settings under a given set of conditions and running test samples, measuring the samples, readjusting the settings, until the output process is brought to an optimal state. Once optimized, a final set of measurements are made of output samples and this data becomes part of the baseline information.

The baseline is then characterized by outputting ECI or IT8.7/4 test charts (samples of color patches), then the charts are scanned with a spectrophotometer to finally produce a color profile of the baseline.

Over time, specific device performance (and other conditions) may vary. Certainly different devices of the same device type will also vary with respect to the baseline data. However it is essential that the proofing system always perform as closely as possible to the original color profile. Calibration is a process of outputting more color charts, measuring them and adjusting the color mapping until system performance is as close as possible to the original baseline and color profile. During calibration, device settings may also be changed to achieve an optimal output process and subsequent color match.

In ideal circumstances, the printing press will also be characterized and calibrated using similar techniques. When there exists a color profile of the press device and a color profile of proofing device, the best emulation of the press on the proofing device is possible. Doing this accurately requires well controlled and repeatable processes (including calibration), in order to ensure that the color profiles continue to represent the devices involved.

Proof Validation is another aspect of process control. While calibration only ensures that the proofing system is producing output as close to the baseline as possible, proof validation embeds color charts in the artwork itself to ensure that at the artwork matches an industry color standard or a custom color standard (i.e. a specific press that has been characterized). In short, it validates that the proofing system emulates the desired press results accurately.

=== Proofing for packaging ===
Producing proofs for packaging faces a number of challenges beyond those for conventional offset press.

Often, customers want three-dimensional mock-ups of the actual package. This could be cardboard, metal (i.e., aluminum pop can), glass, plastic, etc. This can be very difficult, or impossible to do effectively using inkjet printers, so typically laminate processes such as Kodak APPROVAL or Fuji FINALPROOF are needed, so that the proof can be transferred to the preferred packaging materials.

Printers may supply constructed digital or hand-cut mock-ups to validate dielines, geometry, and alignment before production. For structurally complex or color-critical packaging, multiple proofing passes are used to lower the risk of fit, layout, or color defects before press.

In the case of cardboard cartons, an automated cutting-and-creasing table is useful. Typically, computer-aided design (CAD) software is used to define the cuts and creases based on the proof geometry, and this is fed into the cutting-and-creasing table software.

Most packaging is printed using flexography, because it is more versatile over the range of materials used in packaging. However, the image quality of flexographic prints is often inferior to offset presses, and it is important to simulate the characteristics of the press in the proofs so that customers have realistic expectations for the final packaging. Similarly certain materials, such as corrugated cardboard, add their own characteristics to the image, and these too need to be simulated.

== See also ==
- Artist's proof
- Galley proof
- Online artwork proofing, feedback, review and approval tool
- Online proofing
- Press check (printing)
