= Substrate (printing) =

Substrate is used in a converting process such as printing or coating to generally describe the base material onto which, e.g. images, will be printed. Base materials may include:

- plastic films or foils,
- release liner
- textiles,
- plastic containers
- any variety of paper (lightweight, heavyweight, coated, uncoated, paperboard, cardboard, etc.), or
- parchment.

== Electronics ==
Printing processes such as silk-screening and photolithography are used in electronics to produce printed circuit boards and integrated circuits. Some common substrates used are;

- Glass-reinforced epoxy, eg FR-4 board
- Ceramic-PTFE laminate, eg 6010 board
- Alumina ceramic
- Silicon
- Gallium arsenide
- Sapphire
- Quartz

== Bibliography ==
- Rogers, John WM; Plett, Calvin, Radio Frequency Integrated Circuit Design, Artech House, 2010 ISBN 1-60783-980-6.
