= Raster image processor =

Printing component that produces a raster image

Generating the raster image data

A raster image processor (RIP) is a component used in a printing system which produces a raster image also known as a bitmap. Such a bitmap is used by a later stage of the printing system to produce the printed output. The input may be a page description in a high-level page description language such as PostScript, PDF, or XPS, including raster and/or vector graphics. The input can also be or include bitmaps of higher or lower resolution than the output device, which the RIP resizes using an image scaling algorithm.

Originally a RIP was a rack of electronic hardware which received the page description via some interface (e.g. RS-232) and generated a "hardware bitmap output" which was used to enable or disable each pixel on a real-time output device such as a laser printer, an optical film recorder, computer to film, or computer to plate.

A RIP can be implemented as a software module on a general-purpose computer, or as a firmware program executed on a microprocessor inside a printer. For high-end typesetting, standalone hardware RIPs are sometimes used. Ghostscript, GhostPCL, and ColorBurst's Overdrive (for macOS) are examples of software RIPs. Every PostScript printer contains a RIP in its firmware. The RIP chip in a laser printer sends its raster image output to the laser.

Earlier RIPs retained backward compatibility with phototypesetters/photosetters, so they supported the older languages. So, for example, Linotype RIPs supported CORA (RIP30).

== Stages of RIP ==
1. Interpretation: This is the stage where the supported PDLs (page description languages) are translated into a private internal representation of each page. Most RIPs process pages serially, one page at a time, so the current machine state is only for the current page. After a page has been output, the page state is discarded to prepare for the next page.
2. Rendering: A process through which the private internal representation is turned into a continuous-tone bitmap. In practical RIPs, interpretation and rendering are frequently done together. Simple languages were designed to work on minimal hardware, so tend to "directly drive" the renderer.
3. Screening: In order to print, the continuous-tone image is converted into a halftone (pattern of dots). Two screening methods or types are amplitude modulation (AM) screening and stochastic or frequency modulation (FM) screening. In AM screening, dot size varies depending on object density—tonal values; dots are placed in a fixed grid. In FM screening, dot size remains constant and dots are placed in random order to create darker or lighter areas of the image; dot placement is precisely controlled by sophisticated mathematical algorithms.

== See also ==
- Image tracing – raster-to-vector conversion
- Laser printing
