= Computer to film =

Printing process

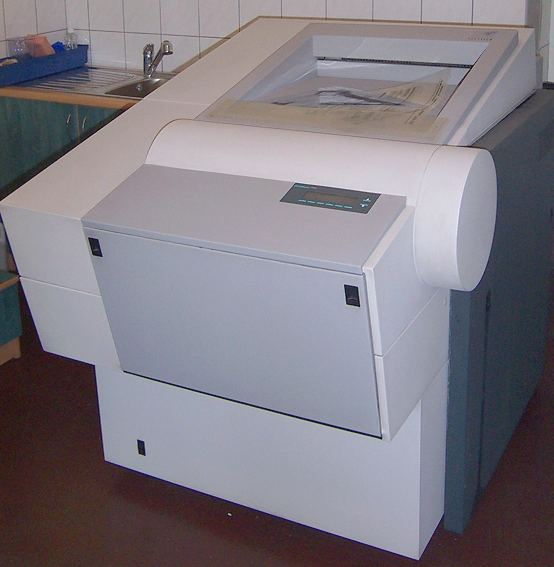
ScanView photosetter DotMate5000

Computer to film (CTF) is a print workflow involving printing of a design file from a computer straight to a film through an imagesetter. Designs are typically created in desktop publishing software packages. An imagesetter is an ultra-high resolution large-format computer output device for CTF.

For multi-coloured printing, the image is broken up into multiple layers representing each of the spot colors or the CMYK process colors, this may be split manually by the designer or separated by software in the imagesetter itself. Each color is made into its own piece of film and plate. There can be 12 or more colors used in a single production run; however, 1-6 colors are typical.

From the imagesetter, the film is taken to the plate maker, where the film is laid on top of photopolymer plate material. A vacuum is then drawn to ensure tight contact between the plate and film, the plate is then exposed with UV light. The plate is then washed in a solvent solution, typically water, where the unexposed areas wash away leaving a relief. It is then dried and given a second and final exposure without the film for durability. The plate can then be fitted onto an offset, rotary or flexographic printing press ready to print the product. A printing plate can produce 100,000 impressions or more before showing signs of wear, after which a new plate can be made from the original film.

Computer to film is being replaced by the more advanced computer to plate (CTP) technology.
