= Computer to plate =

Imaging technology used in printing

Computer-to-plate (CTP) is an imaging technology used in modern printing processes whereby an image created in a desktop publishing (DTP) application is output directly to a printing plate.

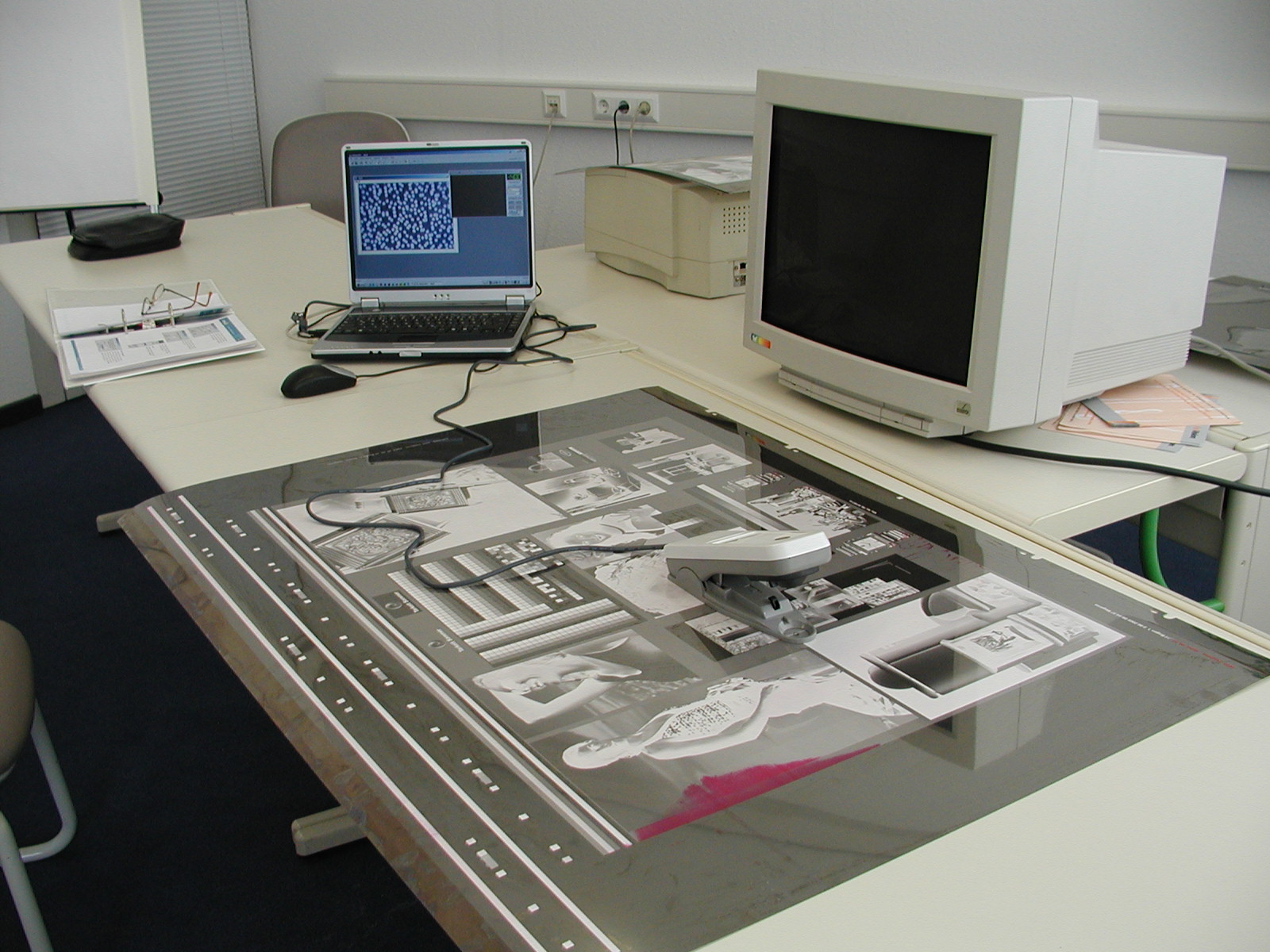
Negative lithographic printing plate

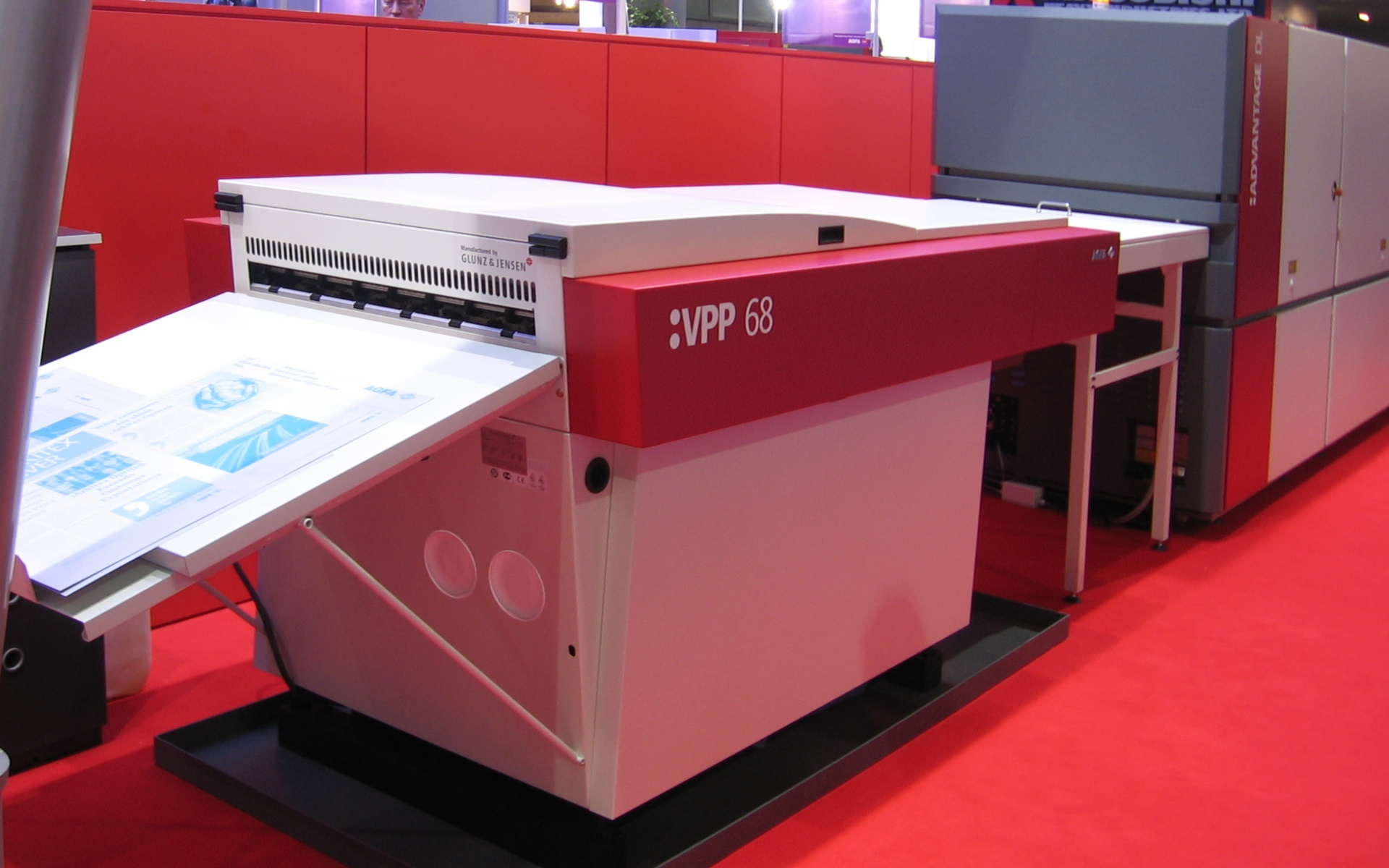
Agfa Advantage DL violet laser imagesetter with VPP68 plate processor

This compares with the older computer-to-film (CTF) technology, where the computer file is output onto a photographic film which is used to make a printing plate, in a similar manner to a contact proof in darkroom photography.

== Technology ==
CTP methods differ according to the construction type of the imagesetter and the light source used to expose the plate surface. In terms of construction type there are three different kinds: internal drum, external drum and flat-bed imagesetters. The two main light sources used to expose the plate are ultraviolet light lamps and laser diodes. The wavelength and energy of the laser diodes depend on the type of plate that is used. This technology is mainly used in newspaper and magazine printing.

=== Internal drum imagesetters ===
In an internal drum image setter the plate is put into a cylinder, while the imaging head moves along the axis of the cylinder to expose the plate. The rotating mirror at the end of the imaging head rotates around its axis to beam the laser on the desired part of the fixed plate. The construction type makes it more difficult to use several lasers at the same time, but just using one laser also has advantages such as uniform beam intensity over the whole plate imaging period.

=== External drum image setters ===
The plate is wrapped around a drum that can rotate around its axis, while the imaging head that projects the image on the plate can move along this axis to focus the laser beam on the surface. The simple construction type makes it possible to arrange multiple image heads next to each other and use them simultaneously. This leads to a decrease of the imaging time needed to expose a whole printing plate.

=== Flat-bed image setters ===
The image is reproduced line by line on a fixed flat printing plate by a laser beam that is deflected by a rotating polygon mirror and then onto the printing plate. Because of the setup the laser beam becomes less accurate at the edges of the printing plate and is therefore mainly smaller formats or production with lower quality expectations.

== Types of plates ==
=== Photopolymer plates ===
- Photosensitivity between 380 nm and 550 nm
- low laser energy of 30 to 100 μJ/cm^{2} needed for exposure
- run lengths of up to 300,000 prints
- negative plate

=== Silverhalogen plates ===
- Silverhalogen aluminium printing plates
- photosensitivity between 400 nm and 700 nm
- low laser energy of 1 to 2 μJ/cm^{2} needed for exposure
- run lengths of up to 150,000 prints
- resolution to 450 LPI possible
- dot reproduction 1–99%
- positive plate

=== Thermal plates ===
- Photosensitivity between 830 nm and 1.070 nm
- laser energy between 70 and 200 mJ/cm^{2} needed for exposure
- run lengths from 100,000 up to 500,000 prints
- resolution to 200 LPI–400 LPI possible
- dot reproduction 1–99%
- high process stability
- many providers
- processing in the daylight possible

== Comparison with CTP ==
=== Advantages ===
CTP has several advantages over conventional platemaking. In CTP, one generation (transfer of film image to the printing plate) is removed from the printing process (eliminating the need for film and related developer chemicals), increasing sharpness and detail. CTP avoids potential losses in quality that may occur during film processing, including scratches in the film, and variations in the exposure. An imagesetter usually has an accuracy rate of ±2%. Plates are produced in less time, are more consistent, and at a lower cost. CTP can also improve registration and image-to-edge repeatability over traditional methods. More recent advancements in CTP plate technology made by companies such as DuPont and PlateCrafters have further widened the gap with analog plates, allowing for very fine vignettes and minimal dot gain on press.

In CTP, the media is registered (held in precise position) in the platesetter during imaging, and does not rely on a separately-aligned pin grid, as is the case with film. Defects due to dust, scratches or other artifacts are minimized.

CTP systems can significantly increase plate production outputs. Platesetters for newspaper production can output up to 300 12-inch (300 mm) plates per hour at 1,270 dpi (dots per inch), whilst for commercial applications a CTP system could output 60 B1 plates at 2,400 dpi for higher screen rulings.

Small portrait presses that typically create one- or two-color output can use anything from a standard laser printer, for low quality/low volume, up to a higher-end dedicated platesetter for higher quality and volume.

=== Disadvantages ===
CTP is restricted to digital format. CTP productions require that the basis for the printed matter as well as the imposition be digital.

In CTP, if for some reason a plate is damaged, if an error occurs when it is ripped or if something has to be corrected after the plate is exposed, a completely new, imposed plate must be created.

== See also ==
- Color printing
- Digital press
