= Weaving (disambiguation) =

Weaving is assembling threads into cloth.

Weaving or weave may also refer to:

- Weaving (surname), a surname (and list of people with the name)
- Weave (digital printing)
- Weaving (horse), behavior pattern
- Weaving (knitting)
- Weaving (mythology), a literary theme
- Weave (Forgotten Realms), a fictional magic-producing fabric in Forgotten Realms
- Basket weaving
- Hair weave
- Mozilla Weave
- Weaving, field combination deinterlacing of television images
- Weaving, program transformation in Aspect-oriented programming
- Weaving, grade-separation in vehicular traffic

== See also ==
- Bob and weave
