= George Tutill =

Banner manufacturer (1817–1887)

- Born: April 16, 1817; Howden, Yorkshire
- Died: February 17, 1887 (aged 69); West Ham, Essex (now London)
- Burial place: Howden Minster
- Occupations: Manufacturer of banners and regalia, artist, entrepreneur

George Tutill (16 April 1817—17 February 1887) was an artist, entrepreneur and manufacturer of banners. He was born in Howden, Yorkshire, he had founded his business by 1847 which became renowned for supplying trade unions, Sunday schools, chapels, and friendly societies with banners and regalia. The company, eventually located at 83 City Road, London, also offered a range of products including flags, badges, brooches and stationary. It exported goods globally, with Tutill personally traveling to the United States, Australia, and New Zealand in the late 1870s and 1880s to find new customers and exhibit products.

Tutill's banners were robust and lightweight and could reach up to 12 ft (3.7 m) by 11 ft (3.4 m) in size, featuring illustrations painted or woven directly onto the silk. The banners were often flown at public events and union gatherings. Their ubiquity reflected the growing social and political significance of the working class. The banners’ designs became standardised over time, featuring a central medallion or roundel surrounded by decorative foliage and lettering.

Tutill was also an artist and was most prolific in landscape paintings, which he exhibited in both the Royal Academy of Arts and the Royal Society of Arts. He was additionally actively involved with the friendly society the Ancient Order of Foresters, serving as deputy chairman and District Chief Ranger.

After Tutill's death in 1887, his business was left to his daughter Georgina Lewis. The company relocated to Chesham and gradually moved away from banner manufacturing in favour of flag-making. Tutill has been recognised as defining the artistic style of trade union and similar banners, and for turning the banner-making craft into an industry.

== Early life ==
George Tutill was born in Howden, Yorkshire on 16 April 1817. Little is known about Tutill's upbringing. His mother was Elizabeth Tutill (née Richardson) and his father, Thomas Tutill, earned a livelihood as a corn miller. They were married in a church in Howden and their only child recorded in the parish's baptism register was George Tutill. There is no substantiated evidence to support the occasional assertion that Tutill was involved in the world of travelling showmanship during his younger years. (Note: In Banner Bright (1986), John Gorman shares a story from Ronald Caffyn which includes the statement that Tutill began his life as a travelling showman, but Gorman states that this story is "uncorroborated". Logan also asserts that there is no evidence of this travelling showman story.)

== Banner and regalia manufacturing ==
=== Founding and overview of business ===
Tutill was most well known for and most accomplished in his banner and regalia manufacturing business. Adverts for the firm, published after his death, claim that he founded it in 1837 aged 19–20. However, the 1838 Hull trade directory does not include such an entry. The company had definitely been established by 1847 and was associated with the address 52 Banner Street, St Luke's in London. At the time, Tutill was living in Aldgate and in the 1851 was described as a "banner supplyer". By 1859, Tutill's business was based at Canonbury, and the following year it had moved to 83 City Road, London where the business would remain until the Second World War. Tutill chose to locate his business in East London partly due to its close proximity to the large Spitalfields and Bethnal Green Huguenot silk-weaving communities. Other craftsmen, designers and machinists could also be found nearby. The building on City Road was purpose-built to allow the ideal conditions for artistic creation and manufacturing, such as a glass roof to let in natural light.

Tutill primarily specialised in making products for trade unions, where he spotted a gap in the market. Tutill's move to City Road in 1859 coincided with the growth in trade unions across Britain in the 1860s. Tutill's products were highly sought-after and fashionable, becoming particularly entrenched within union culture. This expansion of unionism was evident in part by the fact that by 1889, Tutill's company was producing at least one banner a day. From 1837, they produced over 75% of all trade union banners.

Tutill's other customers for banners included Sunday schools, chapels and friendly societies. To cater to this wide consumer base, the company offered cheaper basic designs suitable for a variety of groups and organisations, whilst retaining the promise that every banner would contain unique elements. Banners became more expensive if technical details were requested such as detailed portraits copied from photographs or written descriptions. Alongside banners and regalia, Tutill's business manufactured an assortment of other products including flags, badges, brooches, leather cases, safes, stationary, medals and horns. Tutill recorded all of his correspondence from 1840 onwards and ensured that every banner produced by the company was photographed once it became possible to do so.

=== International business ===
Tutill's advertisements claimed that his company would export oversees, stating that they sold "to the remotest parts of the civilised world". Tin-lined cases were used to protect the exported goods against harsh climates. In the late 1870s and 1880s, Tutill travelled to the United States (including Hawaii), Australia and New Zealand to find new customers for union and society banners. He sought opportunities to sell his products to immigrants in the colonies who were starting to form their own unions, inspired by those back in Britain. In Australia, he won awards for his banners at the Sydney, Melbourne, Brisbane and Adelaide Exhibitions, although Roger Logan notes that this did not have a major impact on his business.

=== Banner manufacturing process ===
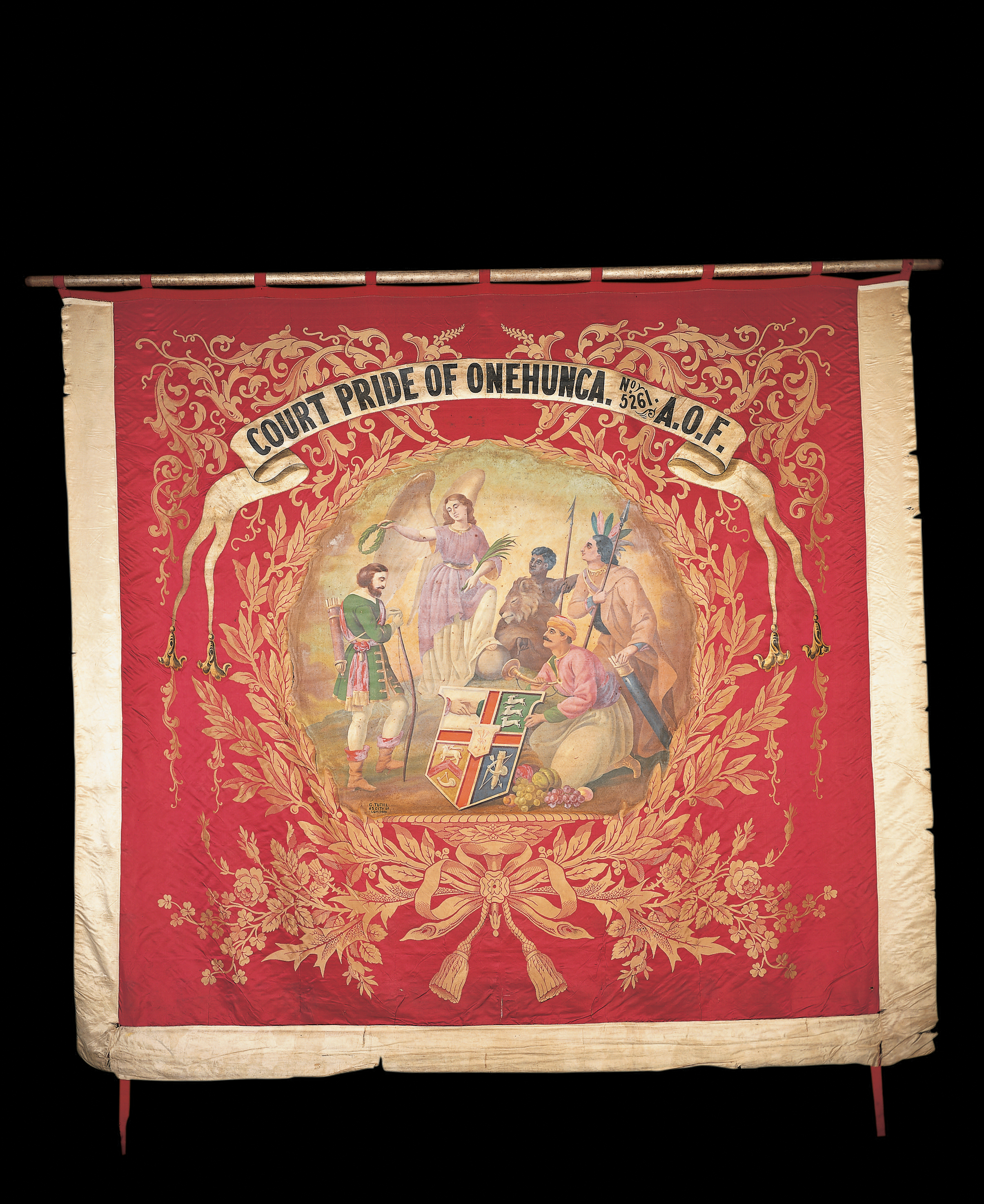
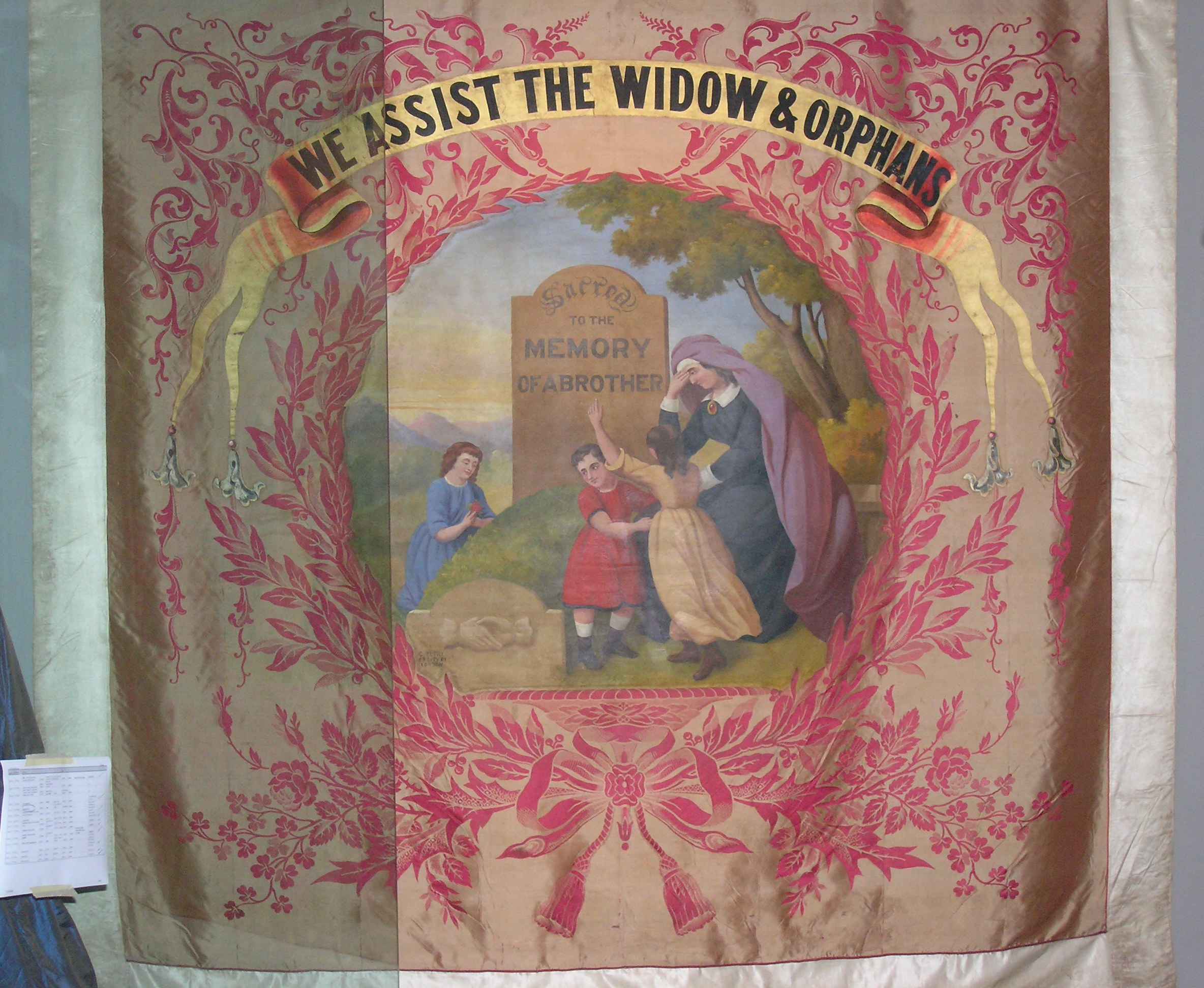
Two examples of banners manufactured by Tutill for the Court Pride of Onehunga, Ancient Order of Foresters.

Tutill's banners were made out of silk, chosen for its robust and lightweight properties. Tutill started by purchasing the silk lengths from Spitalfields and France, but installed his own looms in the 1860s in order to control production quality. To create the banners, raw silk was woven on the looms. In the early 1880s, Tutill installed a Jacquard Loom which he claimed to be the world's largest at the time. It allowed for the assembly of complex designs with two colours and utilised a punch card system.

Tutill's business offered two-sided woven and non-woven banners. Illustrations on the non-woven banners were painted directly onto the silk; for woven banners, they were woven into the silk itself. These illustrations were trusted to expert artists with specialities including portraiture, signwriting and landscape art. The ink used for banner art often bled into the silk, which led to Tutill seek a solution. Following a successful patent in 1861, Tutill began creating his ‘Patent india rubber pure silk banners’. The silk banners were coated in two layers of india rubber, after which quick-drying oil paints could be applied to the silk whilst ensuring it remained robust and flexible, with the paint flexing alongside the silk. The technique also preserved the colour of the banners.

Tutill flags could reach up to 12 ft (3.7 m) by 11 ft (3.4 m) in size and need up to eight men to carry it, split between holding the poles and ropes. The poles were made out of Douglas pine with brass furnishings. Towards the end of Tutill's life, the banners produced by his firm were so large that they required transportation in custom-made carriages.

=== Style and reception ===
Gwyn A. Williams writes that Tutill's banners were physical manifestations of aspiration, acclamation and success, flown at public events and union gatherings. The simultaneously intricate and bold imagery of Tutill's banners, along with their significant cost for many groups, was emblematic of the growing social and political relevance of the working class. Tutill's large, bold but often short-lived products became staples of working class community movements across the country and elsewhere.

Over time, the design of Tutill's banners became standardised: a medallion or roundel in the centre surrounded by decorative foliage and lettering on painted streamers or scrollwork. They also contained imagery which was characterised by, but sometimes criticised for, drawing upon classical and biblical iconography. This was to inspire onlookers with pictures and scenes with which they would be familiar. The imagery was interchangeable, allowing customers to choose from a range of standard images that would best suit their cause. The art style of these banner images was in part inspired by the cartoons and illustrations of Walter Crane, an artist who dedicated much of his work to socialist and union causes. Tutill's products defined the genre for many years, with other manufacturers often copying his style.

== Art ==
Throughout his life and in official documents, Tutill self-described himself as variations of an "artist", such as in his first marriage certificate where he listed his profession at "artist", and in 1864 when he was recorded as being a "decorative artist". He was most prolific as a painter of landscape art and displayed his paintings at exhibitions. In 1846, one of Tutill's paintings, Scarborough Castle, was featured at the Royal Academy. From 1850 to 1852, Tutill exhibited five paintings at the British Institution: Douglas Bay (1850), Laxey (1851), Holy Island Castle (1851), Tare Mountain (1852), Killarney and Glengareff (1852). He displayed two works at the Royal Society of British Arts in the 1850s: Bantry Bay (1855), Hungry Mountain in the distance (1855), and Mouth of the Humber (1855). Tutill claimed to have exhibited at the Royal Exhibition, the first instance being an advert in 1859, but there is no evidence to support this. Tutill claimed to have exhibited at the Royal Exhibition, the first instance being an advert in 1859, but there is no evidence to support this. Roger Logan suggests that painting became less of a priority for Tutill after the 1850s.

As for his banner art, Paula James argue that even if he was not a travelling showman before starting his business, Tutill's artistic style may have been influenced by fairground art. Annie Ravenhill-Johnson argues, however, that the common structures of union banners had been codified before Tutill began designing them.

== Personal life ==
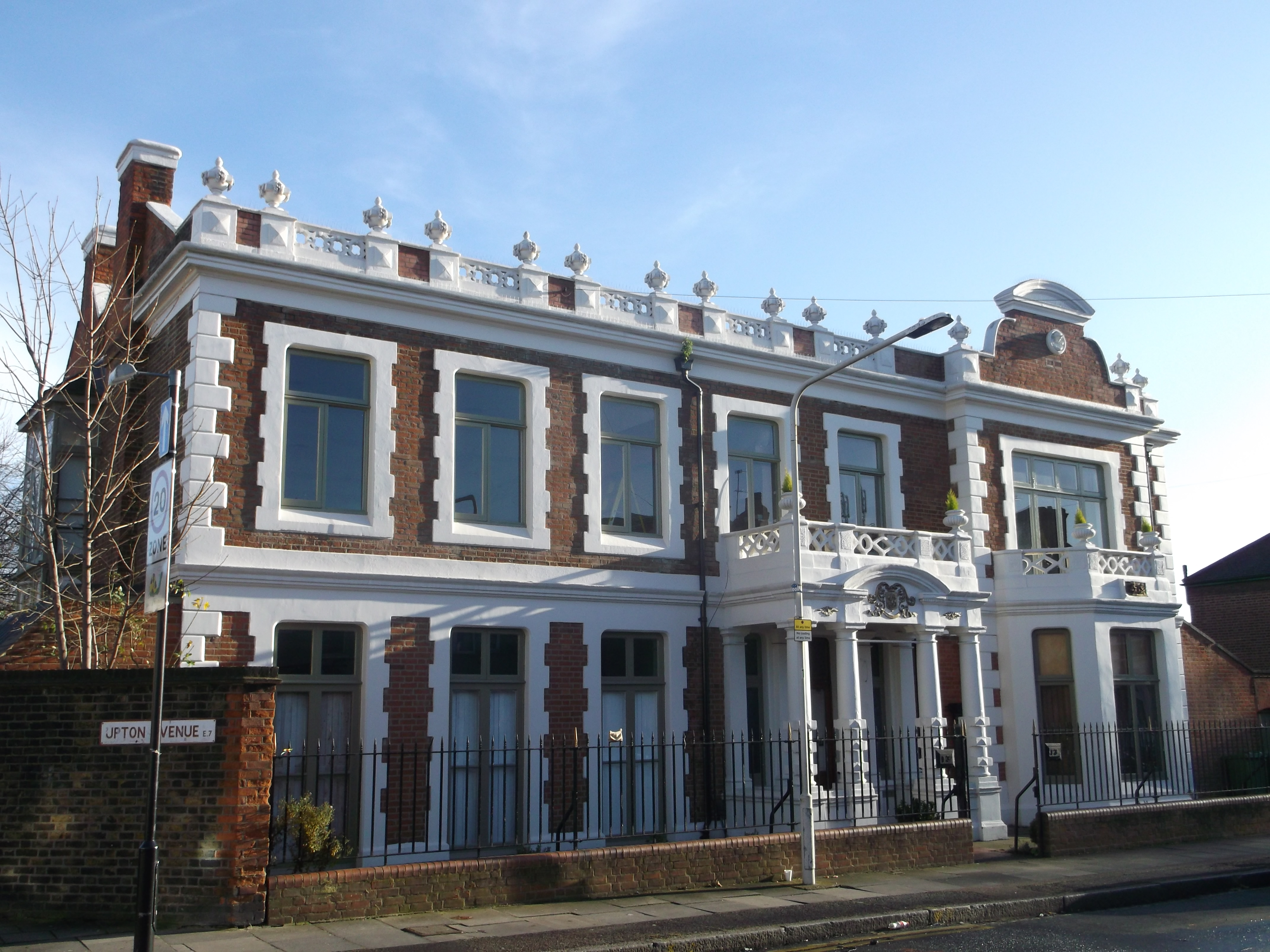
The Red House, Tutill's home until his death in 1887

In June 1838, Tutill married his first wife, Emma Fairfield, in Yorkshire. By 1841 they had moved to Middlesex. Later that same year, Fairfield died of tuberculosis. In the 1861 census, Tutill was recorded as living in Islington and having a daughter aged six, but no wife. Historian Roger Logan notes that the girl was most likely the daughter of Thomas Trout Bale and Elizabeth Alsop Bale, who had four children together. Tutill and Elizabeth Bale had a son (George) and a daughter (Georgina); it in unclear whether Elizabeth was married to Thomas Trout Bale at the time. In 1864, Bale and Tutill's son died from meningitis. Bale and Tutill married on 5 April 1878 and lived in Red House in Upon Lane, West Ham—a move which symbolised Tutill's success. He lived there until his death in 1887. His wife died in 1884.

Tutill was involved with friendly societies throughout his life and would sometimes refer to himself as "Brother Tutill". In 1842, new Court of the Ancient Order of Foresters was established in the City of London, known as Court Uriah. Tutill joined in September 1842 and within a few years had become an active member: he was deputy chairman in 1844 and District Chief Ranger in 1845. As part of this latter role, he attended the openings of new Courts. By 1847 he was working as a sales agent for a former High Chief Ranger of the Society. In recognition of Tutill's involvement with the Society, District delegates agreed in 1847 that subscriptions should be collected to present Tutill with a testimonial. In April 1848, a Mordant patent silver pencil case was presented to Tutill.

After Court Uriah was closed, Tutill transferred to Court Industry in 1851, which was part of the larger London United District. He remained involved in the Order into the 1850s. He used his association to the benefit of his business: he advertised his company in publication of the Order of the Foresters: Foresters Miscellany, and a significant opportunity came in August 1855 with the first annual Foresters fete at Crystal Palace where he displayed his banners. 28,000 people attended the fete that year, and just three years later attendance had increased to 45,000. After 1861 there are limited records of his involvement. Tutill distanced himself from the Ancient Order of Foresters following the 1850 Friendly Societies Act and subsequent rulings which discouraged Orders from misusing funds to purchase banners, although some Orders did continue to purchase banners after this point.

There is no evidence that Tutill shared the same ideologies as the unions and societies he served. Gorman describes him as an “uncompromising capitalist” who nonetheless catered to socialist movements and was friends with prominent people in the trade union movement. His own business was not permitted to unionise until 1934. He also served clients in the temperance movement but was known to keep whisky in his office.

== Death and legacy ==
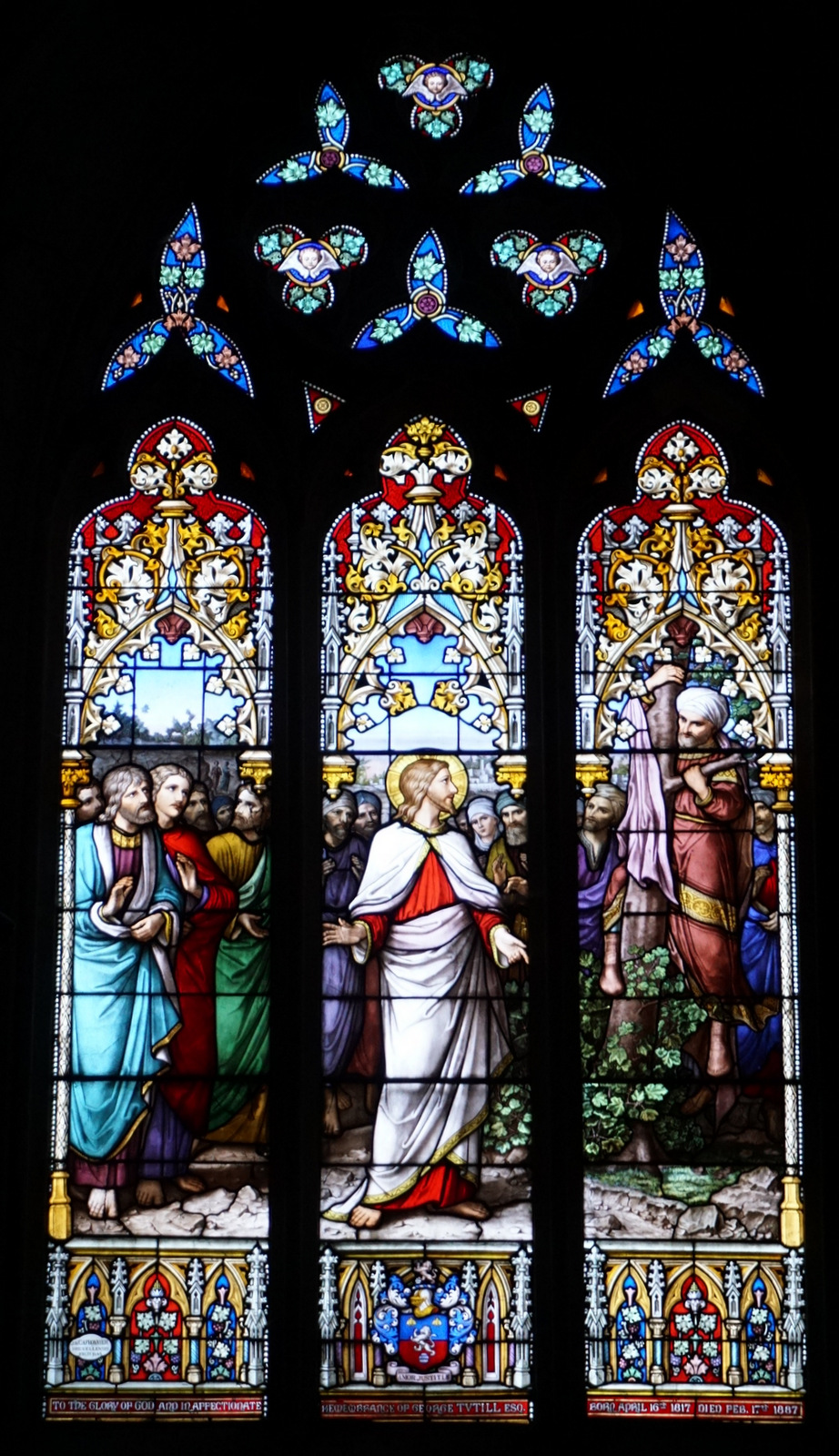
Stained glass window in Howden Minster dedicated to George Tutill, depicting the biblical story of Zacchaeus.

On 17 February 1887, Tutill died in his house in West Ham. Tutill was buried in the church yard of Howden Minster. In 1888, the Minster revealed a memorial window in the west end of the church in his honour. Designed by Jean Baptiste Capronnier, an artist from Brussels, the window is in three segments and depicts the biblical story of Zacchaeus, who is shown climbing down from a sycamore tree.

Tutill's will left the business, described as “Regalia Manufacturer” to his daughter Georgina Lewis. Tutill's Chief Clerk, William Henry Smith, was to be granted a quarter of the profits of the business in recognition of his role as Manager. Tutill's employees at the time of his death who had been employed for at least five years each received £20. (Note: Equivalent to roughly £2274 now.) After Tutill's death, adverts for his business still appeared to state that Tutill himself was in charge. In reality, his daughter Georgina's second husband—Henry Storey—now headed the company. Their son Lewis took over management after Storey. Catalogues from after his death indicate that the company was still using similar manufacturing techniques as to when Tutill has alive.

Tarde union banner manufacturing increased after the First World War, but subsequently decreased. The vast majority of Tutill's records, and the building at 83 City Road, were destroyed in the 1940 Blitz. The building was rebuilt and remained open until the 1960s. 1967 was the first year in which Tutill's business did not produce any trade union banners. As the market for banners and regalia declined, the company pivoted towards flag manufacturing. By the 1970s, Tutill's company—named George Tutill Ltd—had moved to Chesham and was associated with Turtle and Pearce Ltd in Southwark. It later changed its name to Flagmakers Ltd.

Clare Hunter writes that Tutill had transformed banner-making from an amateur craft into an industry. Gwyn A. Williams states that Tutill had the “capacity to produce at a possible price a form of public and popular art which could immediately communicate in visual terms at once familiar and elevated and yet leave room for high spirits”.

== See also ==
- Banner-making
