= Vehicle registration plates of Illinois =

Illinois vehicle license plates

Illinois
Current series
- Slogan: Land of Lincoln
- Size: 12 in × 6 in 30 cm × 15 cm
- Material: Aluminum
- Serial format: AB 12345
- Introduced: January 1, 2017
- Designer: Illinois Secretary of State staff

Availability
- Issued by: Illinois Secretary of State
- Manufactured by: Macon Resources, Inc., Decatur, Illinois

History
- First issued: July 1, 1911 (pre-state plates from July 1, 1907 through June 30, 1911)

The U.S. state of Illinois first required its residents to register their motor vehicles in 1907. Registrants provided their own license plates for display until 1911, when the state began to issue plates. As of 2026, plates are issued by the Illinois Secretary of State.

Front and rear plates are required on most vehicle types, with the exception of motorcycles, motor-driven cycles, and trailers. Plates were issued annually until 1979; multi-year plates have been issued ever since. Plates belong to vehicle owners, so they can be transferred from one vehicle to another.

== Early history: 1907–1939 ==
Automobile owners in Illinois were first required to register their vehicles with the Secretary of State's office in 1907, paying a one-time registration fee of $2. Registrants were issued a numbered aluminum disc to place on their dashboard, but they had to provide their own license plates. Annual registration commenced in 1909.

The state began to issue license plates in 1911. Front and rear plates were required each year, along with an aluminum dashboard disc whose number matched the serial on the plate. The legislation authorizing the state issuance of license plates also provided for the registration and plating of motorcycles, and issued special licenses and plates to mechanics and chauffeurs.

Serials were all-numeric and originally ran to five digits. When 99999 was reached in 1914 and 1915, serials with one letter and four digits were issued. Six-digit all-numeric serials were introduced in 1916, followed in 1925 by seven-digit serials. Aluminum dashboard discs were discontinued after 1917.

Trucks received their own plates for the first time in 1920. Serials on these plates were all-numeric until 1930, when weight codes were introduced. Trailers received their own plates from 1924 onwards.

In 1927, the state issued its first graphic license plate, featuring an embossed state shape to the right of the serial.

== Mid-century history: 1940–1978 ==
With the entry of the United States into World War II, and the subsequent introduction of measures to conserve metal for the war effort, Illinois manufactured its license plates for 1943 from wood-based fiberboard instead of steel. This practice continued each year up to and including 1948, despite the war ending in 1945 with the surrender of Japan. The state reverted to manufacturing its plates from steel in 1949, although the 1950 and 1951 plates were instead manufactured from aluminum.

License plates were placed under the jurisdiction of the Secretary of State in 1953. The 1954 plates were the first to feature the "Land of Lincoln" slogan, which continues to be used today.

In 1956, the United States, Canada, and Mexico came to an agreement with the American Association of Motor Vehicle Administrators, the Automobile Manufacturers Association and the National Safety Council that standardized the size for license plates for vehicles (except those for motorcycles) at 6 inches (15 cm) in height by 12 inches (30 cm) in width, with standardized mounting holes. The 1956 (dated 1957) issue was the first Illinois license plate that fully complied with these standards: the 1955 (dated 1956) issue was 6 inches in height by 12 inches in width, but had non-standard mounting holes.

== Multiyear baseplates: 1979–present ==
In late 1966 the implementation of five year license plates, which would use renewal tabs annually, was proposed. Their use would also aid police in identifying drivers because the books that listed all license plate numbers were not available until halfway through the year. With fewer plate numbers changing, the books would be relevant for longer periods of time. Paul Powell, the Illinois Secretary of State, rejected the proposal stating that any cost savings would be minimized by additional record keeping costs. He also mentioned that some multiyear plates used in other states were not satisfactory. Powell further reiterated his position the following month by mentioning a University of Illinois study which recommended the annual change in license plate colors as an incentive for motorists to pay the annual registration cost, and that the initial cost of the longer term plates would be much more than regular plates. The University of Illinois study mentioned by Powell was conducted in 1957 and 1958, and also recommended the addition of letters to the Illinois license plate. In 1969 Powell backed a plan to implement two-year plates, which would have cost twice the annual registration price, but the plan did not pass the legislature.

In January 1975 it was recommended that Illinois retain the practice of issuing annual license plates by an advisory committee to Secretary of State Michael Howlett. Two year license plates and a staggered registration system were studied by the committee, but both proposals were rejected. Despite this recommendation Howlett appointed a task force in April 1975 to study how to implement multiyear plates. At the conclusion of the study in September 1975 Howlett stated he would propose to the legislature that Illinois begin issuing multiyear plates validated by an annual renewal sticker. The plates were expected to last five years, and they were to be made of aluminum stock that was twice as thick as the current plates in order to make them more durable. With the 1976 license plates already in production, and the 1977 license plate contract already awarded, the implementation of a multiyear license plate system was delayed.

=== Issue of 1979 ===
Legislation to implement a multiyear license plate was finally proposed in 1977. The bill to institute five-year plates passed the House Motor Vehicle Committee on March 16, 1977, and the state House on March 29, 1977. Alan Dixon, the Secretary of State, spoke in favor of passage of the bill. The Senate Transportation Committee passed the bill on April 28, 1977, and the full Senate on June 10, 1977. The bill was signed into law by Governor Jim Thompson on August 4, 1977. With the 1978 contract for license plates already awarded, multiyear plates would not be implemented until 1979. The cost savings from not issuing annual plates for the expected five year life of the plates was $21 million. One change made to the legislation before becoming a law gave the Secretary of State the discretion to determine how long the plates would last. This change would have long-term implications as there was not a statutory requirement to issue new license plates every five years.

The 1979 issue of new license plates was complicated by the fact that the state was converting to a staggered registration system at the same time it issued these plates. Under the multiyear system vehicle owners could obtain their new plates and register their vehicles for as few as nine months or as long as 23 months. At this time a full year registration cost $18, so the registration cost was prorated to the number of months that was chosen. A nine-month registration was $13.50 while a 23-month registration cost $34.50. Initially the month that a registration would expire was based upon the last two digits of a license plate number. For instance a plate ending in the number 11 allowed the vehicle owner to register for nine months ending on September 30, 1979, or they could choose an April 30, 1980 expiration. By limiting the choices for expiration to only two different months, the state ensured that registrations would be staggered.

Renewal stickers for the 1979 license plates were blue for 1979, red for 1980, green for 1981, brown for 1982, and orange for 1983.

The multiyear system also eliminated the need for current vehicle owners to replace license plates during the winter months as no registrations were set to expire in December, January, or February. Anyone who purchased a new or used vehicle in the winter months could still end up with license plates that needed to be renewed while it was cold outside. Many other types of vehicles, such as taxis, limousines, dealers, etc. continued to be issued a new plate annually.

=== Issue of 1984 ===
A new multi-year plate was introduced in 1984, replacing all the 1979 plates by the start of 1987. This plate consisted of embossed dark blue characters on a reflective white background, with a light blue band screened across the top containing the state name and the "Land of Lincoln" slogan. Serials on passenger plates issued to new registrants initially consisted of three letters and three numbers, while existing registrants with 1979 plates could retain the all-numeric and two-letter, four-number serials from these plates. After the three-letter, three-number format was completed in 1995, new formats were used consisting of one letter and up to six numbers.

Renewal stickers for these plates were as follows: purple for 1984, green for 1985, orange for 1986, blue for 1987, red for 1988, green for 1989, orange for 1990, maroon for 1991, white for 1992, blue for 1993, dark gray for 1994, red for 1995, white for 1996, green for 1997, gray for 1998, orange for 1999, blue for 2000 and finally red for 2001.

=== Issue of 2001 ===
The new multiyear baseplate, which began to be issued in July 2001, was the first fully graphic passenger plate issued by the state of Illinois. The design, dark red characters on a background that faded from white at the top to dark blue at the bottom, was chosen by Internet voters from among nine different designs. The word "Illinois" was centered in a script font at the top, the "Land of Lincoln" slogan was once more centered at the bottom of the plate, and a single sticker well, half the size of the former well, was at the top right corner. In the center of the plate was a silhouette of Abraham Lincoln. Approximately 8.5 million passenger plates were scheduled to be replaced in a single year although replacement plates for all vehicle types was scheduled to take place over three years. Approximately 6.5 million passenger plates were made in Illinois at Macon County Rehabilitation Facilities, Inc. in Decatur, and another 2 million plates were made by Waldale Manufacturing Ltd. of Amherst, Nova Scotia, Canada in order to produce all of the passenger plates needed in a single year.

=== Issue of 2017 ===
On November 15, 2016, Illinois Secretary of State Jesse White announced that new Illinois license plates would begin to be issued in 2017. As before, the new license plates were announced in conjunction with a multiyear replacement program. The largest change to the plate was the complete replacement of the background image. The image of Abraham Lincoln was moved to the far left, was changed to a dark gray color, only showed the left half of his face, and was nearly the entire height of the plate. Additionally, the rest of the background showed a blue sky above a partial Chicago skyline including the Willis Tower (formerly Sears Tower); a barn with a windpump; and the dome of the Illinois State Capitol building; all of which are all in white. The serial number characters remained in dark red, and the word "Illinois" along with the "Land of Lincoln" slogan were changed to a black seriffed font. The replating program is scheduled to take place over 10 years ending in 2026.

The plate was designed by staff of the Illinois Secretary of State's office, and drew criticism immediately, Blair Kamin of the Chicago Tribune calling the design "busy and banal". Two changes were made to the plate's design within the first year of issuance, both in order to make the serial more readable: the serial's layout was changed from AB1 2345 to AB 12345 (the space coming after the letters instead of after the first digit), before the image of Abraham Lincoln was changed from a dark gray color to a much lighter gray.

In mid 2023, a change in production equipment was made. The serial on plates is now screened from a UV printer and then embossed, rather than embossed first and then roll-painted. With this change, new serial dies are being used which have a font similar to that used in North Carolina. The revised plates began to appear in August 2023, first on remakes of passenger combinations carried over from the previous base, and gradually spreading to new combinations of all types in the following months.

== Passenger baseplates ==
=== Pre-state plates ===
Image	Dates issued	Description	Serial format	Serials issued	Notes
	1907–11	Black on white; vertical "ILL" at right	12345	1 to approximately 38300	Front and rear plates provided by vehicle owner. Most were made of metal or leather. The serial number matched that on the aluminum disc provided to the owner by the state. Requests for low numbers caused the state to issue discs with letter prefixes and numbers 1–20 from 1907 through 1909, with all letters used except 'I'.
	1907–11	Black on white; vertical "ILL" at right	A12	A1 to Z20	Front and rear plates provided by vehicle owner. Most were made of metal or leather. The serial number matched that on the aluminum disc provided to the owner by the state. Requests for low numbers caused the state to issue discs with letter prefixes and numbers 1–20 from 1907 through 1909, with all letters used except 'I'.

=== 1911 to 1978 ===
Image	First issued	Description	Slogan	Serial format	Serials issued	Notes
	1911	Black on white; vertical "ILL" at right	none	12345	1 to approximately 38100	Issued only from July 1 through December 31, 1911.
	1912	White on black; "ILL 1912" at right	none	12345	1 to approximately 67200	First dated plate. Front plates were perforated in order to allow air to pass through to the vehicle's radiator, while rear plates were solid.
	1913	Front: White with border and no background; "ILL 13" at right Rear: White on dark blue; "ILL 13" at right	none	12345	1 to approximately 94100	Front plates were stencil-like, again to facilitate passage of air to the vehicle's radiator.
	1914	Green on white; "ILL 14" at right	none	12345	1 to 99999	Front plates had vertical slits between the characters of the serial; this practice continued through 1918. Letters H, K, P and R used in the A1234 serial format.
	1914	Green on white; "ILL 14" at right	none	A1234	H0001 to approximately R1000	Front plates had vertical slits between the characters of the serial; this practice continued through 1918. Letters H, K, P and R used in the A1234 serial format.
	1915	Dark blue on yellow; "ILL 15" at right	none	12345	1 to 99999	Letters H, K, P, R, T, U, X and Y used in the A1234 serial format.
	1915	Dark blue on yellow; "ILL 15" at right	none	A1234	H0001 to approximately Y9999	Letters H, K, P, R, T, U, X and Y used in the A1234 serial format.
	1916	Black on silver with border line; "ILL 16" at right	none	123456	1 to approximately 249000	
	1917	White on black with border line; "ILL 17" at right	none	123456	1 to approximately 339000	Last year in which aluminum dashboard discs were required.
	1918	Blue on gray with border line; "ILL 18" at right	none	123456	1 to approximately 387000	
	1919	White on brown with border line; "ILL 19" at right	none	123456	1 to approximately 473000	
	1920	Black on orange with border line; "ILL 20" at right	none	123456	1 to approximately 494000	
	1921	White on black with border line; "ILL 21" at right	none	123456	1 to approximately 579000	
	1922	Black on gray with border line; "ILL 22" at right	none	123-456	1 to approximately 681–000	
	1923	White on green with border line; "ILL 23" at right	none	123-456	1 to approximately 841–000	
	1924	Deep yellow on black with border line; "ILL 24" at right	none	123-456	1 to approximately 977–000	
	1925	White on brown with border line; "ILL 25" at right	none	1-234-567	1 to approximately 1–102–000	
	1926	White on dark blue with border line; "ILL 26" at right	none	1-234-567	1 to approximately 1–180–000	
	1927	Black on orange with border line; embossed state shape at right containing debossed "ILL 27" in orange	none	1-234-567	1 to approximately 1–249–000	
	1928	White on maroon with border line; "ILL 28" at right	none	1-234-567	1 to approximately 1–313–000	
	1929	Red on black with border line; "ILL 29" at right	none	1-234-567	1 to approximately 1–411–000	
	1930	White on black with border line; "ILL 30" at right	none	1-234-567	1 to approximately 1–418–000	
	1931	Black on light green with border line; "ILL 31" at right	none	1-234-567	1 to approximately 1–411–000	
	1932	Golden yellow on dark blue with border line; "ILL 32" at right	none	1-234-567	1 to approximately 1–301–000	
	1933	White on dark blue with border line; "ILL 33" at right	none	1-234-567	1 to approximately 1–277–000	
	1934	Yellow on black with border line; "ILL-34", "ILLINOIS-34" or "ILLINOIS-1934" at bottom (see right)	none	1-234-567	1 to approximately 1–285–000	Plates with serials 1 through 999 had "ILL-34" at the bottom; plates with serials 1000 through 9999 had "ILLINOIS-34"; and plates with serials 10-000 and up had "ILLINOIS-1934". The latter two groups were the first plates to feature the full state name.
	1935	Blue on white with border line; "ILL-35", "ILLINOIS-35" or "ILLINOIS-1935" at top	none	1-234-567	1 to approximately 1–351–000	Plates with serials 1 through 999 had "ILL-35" at the top; plates with serials 1000 through 9999 had "ILLINOIS-35"; and plates with serials 10-000 and up had "ILLINOIS-1935".
	1936	White on black with border line; "ILL-36", "ILL-1936" or "ILLINOIS-1936" at bottom	none	1-234-567	1 to approximately 1–475–000	Plates with serials 1 through 999 had "ILL-36" at the bottom; plates with serials 1000 through 9999 had "ILL-1936"; and plates with serials 10-000 and up had "ILLINOIS-1936".
	1937	Black on yellow with border line; "19 - ILLINOIS - 37" at top	none	1-234-567	1 to approximately 1–569–000	
	1938	White on green; "ILLINOIS 38" at bottom	none	1234 567	1 to approximately 1579 000	
	1939	Yellow on black; "ILLINOIS 39" at top	none	1234 567	1 to approximately 1639 000	
	1940	Cream on brown; "ILL 1940" or "ILLINOIS 1940" at bottom	none	1234 567	1 to approximately 1723 000	
	1941	Black on golden yellow; "ILL 1941" or "ILLINOIS 1941" at top	none	1234 567	1 to approximately 1827 000	
	1942	Golden yellow on black; "ILL 1942" or "ILLINOIS 1942" at bottom	none	1234 567	1 to approximately 1750 000	
	1943	Cream on green fiberboard; "ILL. 43" or "ILLINOIS 43" at top	none	1234 567	1 to approximately 1639 000	Manufactured on fiberboard due to metal conservation for World War II. Plates continued to be manufactured in this manner through 1948.
	1944	Cream on brown fiberboard; "ILL. 44" or "ILLINOIS 1944" at bottom	none	1234 567	1 to approximately 1515 000	
	1945	Orange on black fiberboard; "ILL. 45" or "ILLINOIS 1945" at top	none	1234 567	1 to approximately 1513 000	
	1946	White on maroon fiberboard; "ILL. 46" or "ILLINOIS 1946" at bottom	none	1234 567	1 to approximately 1610 000	
	1947	Off-white on green fiberboard; "ILL. 47" or "ILLINOIS 1947" at top	none	1234-567	1 to approximately 1747–000	
	1948	Black on orange fiberboard; "ILL. 48" or "ILLINOIS 1948" at bottom	none	1234 567	1 to approximately 1949 000	Last fiberboard plate.
	1949	Canary yellow on dark blue; "ILL 49" or "ILLINOIS 1949" at top	none	1234 567	1 to approximately 2079 000	First steel plate since 1942.
	1950	Ivy green on off-white; "ILL 1950" at bottom	none	1234 567	1 to approximately 2287 000	First aluminum plate.
	1951	Maroon on unpainted aluminum; "ILL 1951" at top	none	1234 567	1 to approximately 2403 000	
	1952	Midnight blue on burnt orange; "ILL 1952" at bottom	none	1234 567	1 to approximately 2462 000	
	1953	Ruby red on buff; "ILL 1953" at top	none	1234 567	1 to approximately 2580 000	License plates placed under the jurisdiction of the Secretary of State.
	1954	White on kelly green; "19 ILLINOIS 54" at bottom	Land of Lincoln	1234 567	1 to approximately 2700 000	First use of the "Land of Lincoln" slogan.
	1955	Orange lettering on blue base; "19 ILLINOIS 55" at top	Land of Lincoln	1234 567	1 to approximately 2849 000	Issued in the colors of the University of Illinois.
	1956	Ivy green lettering on powder gray base; "19 ILLINOIS 56" at bottom	Land of Lincoln	1234 567	1 to approximately 2980 000	First 6" x 12" plate. It is unconfirmed if this plate was issued to honor Illinois Wesleyan University, whose colors are actually green and white, as no period reference has been found.
	1957	White lettering on red base; "19 ILLINOIS 57" at top	Land of Lincoln	1234 567	1 to approximately 3075 000	Issued in the colors of Illinois State University, in honor of its centennial.
	1958	Purple lettering on white base; "19 ILLINOIS 58" at bottom	Land of Lincoln	1234 567	1 to approximately 3104 000	Issued in the colors of Northwestern University.
	1959	White lettering on brown base; "19 ILLINOIS 59" at top	Land of Lincoln	1234 567	1 to approximately 3224 000	Issued in the colors of Quincy College, in honor of its centennial.
	1960	Gold lettering on royal blue base; "19 ILLINOIS 60" at bottom	Land of Lincoln	1234 567	1 to approximately 3307 000	Issued in the colors of Augustana College and Wheaton College, in honor of their respective centennials.
	1961	White lettering on red base; "19 ILLINOIS 61" at top	Land of Lincoln	123 456	1 to 999 999	Issued in the colors of North Central College, in honor of its centennial. Letters I, O, Q and Z not used in the AB 1234 serial format.
	1961	White lettering on red base; "19 ILLINOIS 61" at top	Land of Lincoln	AB 1234	AA 1000 to approximately NP 7000	Issued in the colors of North Central College, in honor of its centennial. Letters I, O, Q and Z not used in the AB 1234 serial format.
	1962	White lettering on orange base; "19 ILLINOIS 62" at bottom	Land of Lincoln	123 456	1 to 999 999	The orange base was specifically chosen for its visibility, but police officers complained that they could not read the white serials, especially at night.
	1962	White lettering on orange base; "19 ILLINOIS 62" at bottom	Land of Lincoln	AB 1234	AA 1000 to approximately PH 8000	The orange base was specifically chosen for its visibility, but police officers complained that they could not read the white serials, especially at night.
	1963	Yellow lettering on dark green base; "19 ILLINOIS 63" at top	Land of Lincoln	123 456	1 to 999 999	Issued in the colors of Moline-based Deere & Company, in honor of its 125th anniversary.
	1963	Yellow lettering on dark green base; "19 ILLINOIS 63" at top	Land of Lincoln	AB 1234	AA 1000 to approximately RD 6000	Issued in the colors of Moline-based Deere & Company, in honor of its 125th anniversary.
	1964	White lettering on purple base; "19 ILLINOIS 64" at bottom	Land of Lincoln	123 456	1 to 999 999	Issued in the colors of McKendree College and Rockford College, the two oldest colleges in Illinois.
	1964	White lettering on purple base; "19 ILLINOIS 64" at bottom	Land of Lincoln	AB 1234	AA 1000 to approximately SD 7000	Issued in the colors of McKendree College and Rockford College, the two oldest colleges in Illinois.
	1965	Green on white; "19 ILLINOIS 65" at top	Land of Lincoln	123 456	1 to 999 999	The colors were used to honor Secretary of State Charles Carpentier, who died in office on April 3, 1964. T and U not used as first letters in the AB 1234 serial format; this practice continued through 1968.
	1965	Green on white; "19 ILLINOIS 65" at top	Land of Lincoln	AB 1234	AA 1000 to approximately VE 5000	The colors were used to honor Secretary of State Charles Carpentier, who died in office on April 3, 1964. T and U not used as first letters in the AB 1234 serial format; this practice continued through 1968.
	1966	Red on reflective white; "19 ILLINOIS 66" at bottom	Land of Lincoln	123 456	1 to 999 999	First reflective plate.
	1966	Red on reflective white; "19 ILLINOIS 66" at bottom	Land of Lincoln	AB 1234	AA 1000 to approximately WG 3000	First reflective plate.
	1967	Black on reflective white; "19 ILLINOIS 67" at top	Land of Lincoln	123 456	1 to 999 999	Numbers 100–999 added for each series in the AB 1234 serial format.
	1967	Black on reflective white; "19 ILLINOIS 67" at top	Land of Lincoln	AB 1234	AA 100 to approximately SK 2000	Numbers 100–999 added for each series in the AB 1234 serial format.
	1968	Red on reflective white; "19 ILLINOIS 68" at bottom; "18" at top corners	Land of Lincoln	123 456	1 to 999 999	Commemorated Illinois' 150 years of statehood. Numbers 1–99 added for each series in the AB 1234 serial format.
	1968	Red on reflective white; "19 ILLINOIS 68" at bottom; "18" at top corners	Land of Lincoln	AB 1234	AA 1 to approximately SW 9000	Commemorated Illinois' 150 years of statehood. Numbers 1–99 added for each series in the AB 1234 serial format.
	1969	Dark blue on reflective orange; "19 ILLINOIS 69" at top	Land of Lincoln	123 456	1 to 999 999	T added as first letter in the AB 1234 serial format.
	1969	Dark blue on reflective orange; "19 ILLINOIS 69" at top	Land of Lincoln	AB 1234	AA 1 to approximately TP 4000	T added as first letter in the AB 1234 serial format.
	1970	Red on reflective yellow with border line; "19 ILLINOIS 70" at bottom	Land of Lincoln	123 456	1 to 999 999	
	1970	Red on reflective yellow with border line; "19 ILLINOIS 70" at bottom	Land of Lincoln	AB 1234	AA 1 to approximately TW 6000	
	1971	Black on reflective white with border line; "19 ILLINOIS 71" at top	Land of Lincoln	123 456	1 to 999 999	
	1971	Black on reflective white with border line; "19 ILLINOIS 71" at top	Land of Lincoln	AB 1234	AA 1 to approximately VT 8000	
	1972	Blue on reflective white with border line; "19 ILLINOIS 72" at bottom	Land of Lincoln	123 456	1 to 999 999	
	1972	Blue on reflective white with border line; "19 ILLINOIS 72" at bottom	Land of Lincoln	AB 1234	AA 1 to approximately WX 1000	
	1973	Green on reflective white with border line; "19 ILLINOIS 73" at top	Land of Lincoln	123 456	1 to 999 999	U added as first letter in the AB 1234 serial format following WY 9999. Total passenger plates issued exceeds five million for the first time.
	1973	Green on reflective white with border line; "19 ILLINOIS 73" at top	Land of Lincoln	AB 1234	AA 1 to WY 9999; UA 1 to approximately UX 2000	U added as first letter in the AB 1234 serial format following WY 9999. Total passenger plates issued exceeds five million for the first time.
	1974	Red on reflective white with border line; "19 ILLINOIS 74" at bottom	Land of Lincoln	123 456	1 to 999 999	Three-letter serials used for the first time on a trial basis.
	1974	Red on reflective white with border line; "19 ILLINOIS 74" at bottom	Land of Lincoln	AB 1234	AA 1 to WY 9999; UA 1 to UY 9999	Three-letter serials used for the first time on a trial basis.
	1974	Red on reflective white with border line; "19 ILLINOIS 74" at bottom	Land of Lincoln	ABC 123	AAA 100 to approximately AML 500	Three-letter serials used for the first time on a trial basis.
	1975	Black on reflective yellow with border line; "19 ILLINOIS 75" at top	Land of Lincoln	123 456; AB 1234; ABC 123		*Issued in the colors of Peoria-based Caterpillar Inc., in honor of its 50th anniversary. *Three-letter prefix program expanded from about 800 combinations in 1974 to 2,851.
	1976	Blue on reflective white with red and blue United States Bicentennial graphics	Land of Lincoln	123 456; AB 1234; ABC 123	? remakes of previously issued serials	Design chosen following a statewide grade and high school contest; the winner was 10-year-old Kelley Jordan of Normal, Illinois.
	1977	Green on reflective white; "19 ILLINOIS 77" at top	Land of Lincoln	123 456; AB 1234; ABC 123	? remakes of previously issued serials	Plates issued reach the six million mark.
	1978	Black on reflective white with border line; "19 ILLINOIS 78" at bottom	Land of Lincoln	123 456; AB 1234; ABC 123	? remakes of previously issued serials	Last single-year plate, and last year that all license plates in the state expire on the same date.

=== 1979 to present ===
Image	First issued	Description	Slogan	Serial format	Serials issued	Notes
	1979	Dark blue on reflective white; state name screened in dark blue at top	Land of Lincoln	123 456	1 to 999 999	First multi-year base, and first to feature monthly staggered registration. Manufactured in Texas using that state's serial dies, and issued in the colors of Illinois College in honor of its sesquicentennial. Vanity plates introduced 1980. Replaced 1984–86.
	1979	Dark blue on reflective white; state name screened in dark blue at top	Land of Lincoln	AB 1234	AA 1 to ZZ 9999	First multi-year base, and first to feature monthly staggered registration. Manufactured in Texas using that state's serial dies, and issued in the colors of Illinois College in honor of its sesquicentennial. Vanity plates introduced 1980. Replaced 1984–86.
	1982	Dark blue on reflective white; state name screened in dark blue at top	Land of Lincoln	ABC 123	XAA 1 to ZZZ 999	First multi-year base, and first to feature monthly staggered registration. Manufactured in Texas using that state's serial dies, and issued in the colors of Illinois College in honor of its sesquicentennial. Vanity plates introduced 1980. Replaced 1984–86.
	1983	Dark blue on reflective white with light and dark blue stripes; state name screened in dark blue at top left	Land of Lincoln	ABC 123	AAA 1 to ZZZ 999	Seven letter vanity plates become available on January 1, 1984.
	1983	Dark blue on reflective white with light and dark blue stripes; state name screened in dark blue at top left	Land of Lincoln	123 456; AB 1234	Reissues of 1979–82 serials	Seven letter vanity plates become available on January 1, 1984.
	1995	Dark blue on reflective white with light and dark blue stripes; state name screened in dark blue at top left	Land of Lincoln	A 12 345	B 1 to Z 99 999 (see right)	Letters B, C, D, F, J, S, T, Y and Z used in this serial format.
	1996	Dark blue on reflective white with light and dark blue stripes; state name screened in dark blue at top left	Land of Lincoln	A 123 456	B 100 000 to approximately Y 677 000 (see right)	Narrower serial dies. Letters B, C, D, F, J, T and Y used in this serial format. All plates on this base replaced 2001–02.
	2001	Reflective gradient white-to-blue fade with Abraham Lincoln graphic at center; state name screened in blue at top	Land of Lincoln	123 4567	100 0001 to 999 9999	Design selected by voters on the state's web site.
	2001	Reflective gradient white-to-blue fade with Abraham Lincoln graphic at center; state name screened in blue at top	Land of Lincoln	123 456; AB 1234; ABC 123; A12 345; A12 3456	Reissues of 1979–2001 serials	Design selected by voters on the state's web site.
	2006	Reflective gradient white-to-blue fade with Abraham Lincoln graphic at center; state name screened in blue at top	Land of Lincoln	A12 3456	A10 0001 to Z99 9999 (see right)	Letter progressed as follows: G, X, A, H, K, L, N, P, R, S, V, E, Y (70 0000 to 99 9999), Z and Q. I and O were not used, and M, U and W were reserved for Municipal, State Owned and Disabled plates respectively. T, J, F and B have also been found.
	2016	Reflective gradient white-to-blue fade with Abraham Lincoln graphic at center; state name screened in blue at top	Land of Lincoln	AB1 2345	ZZ1 1001 to approximately ZU9 3000 (see right)	Two-letter series progressed as follows: ZX, ZZ, ZY, ZV and ZU. This was to avoid conflicting with serials of the same format on the upcoming 2017 base (below).
	2017	Reflective gradient blue-to-white with white Chicago and Springfield skyline and gray Abraham Lincoln graphic at far left; state name screened in black at top	Land of Lincoln	AB1 2345	AA1 1001 to AF9 9999	Mandatory ten-year plate replacement to be phased in with this base. I and O not used in two-letter series.
	2017	Reflective gradient blue-to-white with white Chicago and Springfield skyline and gray Abraham Lincoln graphic at far left; state name screened in black at top	Land of Lincoln	AB 12345; 123 456	AG 11001 to AP 76000	The seven-character format was briefly halted due to difficulty in reading the characters over the Lincoln graphic. To use up existing sheeting, numbers in 123 456 format were temporarily issued with the serial offset to the right.
	2017	Reflective gradient blue-to-white with white Chicago and Springfield skyline and gray Abraham Lincoln graphic at far left; state name screened in black at top	Land of Lincoln	AB 12345	AP 76001 to EN 76000	Lincoln's portrait was faded from black and dark gray to light gray in order to improve the readability of the plate. Issue started in late 2017.
	2024	Reflective gradient blue-to-white with white Chicago and Springfield skyline and gray Abraham Lincoln graphic at far left; state name screened in black at top	Land of Lincoln	AB 12345	EN 76001 to GL 20816 as of October 9, 2026	New serial dies introduced similar to those used in North Carolina. The serials are screened from a printer rather than traditionally painted. Issue started in August 2023 on remade combinations, and February 2024 on new combinations.

== Non-passenger plates ==
Image	Type	First issued	Design	Serial format	Serials issued	Notes
	Antique Vehicle	1968	Black on cream with a white Illinois state shape outline	123; 1234; 12 345A/V; 123 456A/V	100 to 238 487A/V (as of July 21, 2024)	New plates were issued every two years until 1989, when they were replaced with multi-year plates and renewed with stickers on a five-year cycle.
	Apportioned - Power Unit	1977	Dark blue serial on white background	P 1234; P 12 345; P123456; P1234567	P 1000 to present	One plate is issued; does not utilize renewal stickers. New plates were issued every year through 1992.
	Apportioned - Trailer	1977	Dark blue serial on white background	T 1234; T 12 345; T123456	T 1000 to present	One plate is issued; does not utilize renewal stickers. New plates were issued every year through 1992.
	Autocycle	2015	Red on white, motorcycle-sized plate	123 C/Y; 1234 C/Y	100 C/Y to present	Defined by the Secretary of State as "A 3-wheel motor vehicle that has a steering wheel and seating that does not require the operator to straddle or sit astride it."
	B Truck	1923	White on green with border line; "TRUCK" embossed vertically at left; "ILL" over "23" embossed at right	111-119	1 to 72726	Format used 1922 – 1929
	B Truck	1951 (Rear Plate)	Maroon on Aluminum; "ILL" and "1951" at top center; "REAR" embossed vertically at left	B 123; B1234; B12345; B123456	B 1 to approximately B387 096 (as of 1969)	Front plate similar. Format used continuously from 1935 to 1969 with various changes in spacing.
	B Truck	1983	Embossed black characters on reflective yellow; "Land of Lincoln" at top center; "JUN ILLINOIS 83" at bottom	1234 B 12 345B; 123 456B	1 B to approximately 896 493B (as of 1984)	Format started in 1969 (dated Jun 1970) and ended June 1984; even years instead have slogan at bottom and date at top
	B Truck	1984	Embossed black characters on yellow; "Land of Lincoln" in italics at bottom center; "JUN ILLINOIS 84" at top	1234 B 12 345B; 123 456B	Unknown	
	B Truck	1985	Red on reflective white with red stripes; state name screened in red at top left; "B" embossed at right	1234 B 12 345B; 123 456B	1B to 999 999B	First multiyear truck base. Began June 1984 with screened "85 JUN" expiration, stickers used on new plates every year onward. Replaced in 2003
	B Truck	1985	As above, but with "B TRUCK" embossed vertically at right	1234 AB	101 AA to 9999 ZZ	First multiyear truck base. Began June 1984 with screened "85 JUN" expiration, stickers used on new plates every year onward. Replaced in 2003
	B Truck	2003	Dark blue on reflective white with light blue Abraham Lincoln graphic at center; state name screened in red at top; "B TRUCK" screened vertically at right	1234 A 12 345 A 1234567	1001 A to 99 999 Z; 1000001 to 2874000; plus remakes of previously issued serials	Being replaced by year of manufacture
	B Truck	2020	Dark blue on reflective white with state name screened in red at top; "Land of Lincoln" screened in red at bottom	1234567B	2874000B to 4374493B (as of October 14, 2026); plus remakes of previously issued serials	Replacement of previous plates began in 2020. New serial dies began at approximately 3900000B.
	C Truck	2019	Dark blue on reflective white with state name screened in red at top; "Land of Lincoln" screened in red at bottom	123 456C	100 001C to 237 891C (as of June 3, 2025)	Issued to vehicles weighing 8,001-10,000 lbs.
	Charitable Vehicle	1976	Black serial on white with faded Lincoln graphic; Blue cursive state name at top	1234 CV; 12 345 CV; 12 345 C/V	1001 CV to 48 649 C/V (as of May 30, 2025)	Plates are renewed every two years.
	Dealer	1912	Black serial on white background	D/L 1234 A D/L 1234 AB (variable number of digits)		Plate number identifies the dealership. Plates are issued annually (no validation stickers used). The background color typically changes each year, with various shades of white or beige being most common.
	Disabled	1974	Red serial on 2001 passenger base	123; 1234; 12 345; 123 456	101 to 334 027 (as of January 2, 2026)	The wheelchair symbol is coded as a "W", which can be seen at the top of the registration sticker on the plate image at left. New serial dies began at approximately 331 500; with this, the wheelchair symbol changed from embossed to flat.
	Electric Vehicle	2020	Black serial on white with faded Lincoln graphic; Blue cursive state name at top	12345 EL	1 EL to 99999 EL	New serial dies began at approximately 80801 EL; with this, the letter suffix changed from embossed to flat.
	Electric Vehicle	2020	Black serial on white with faded Lincoln graphic; Blue cursive state name at top	A1234 EL	A1001 EL to D1748 EL (as of July 3, 2026)	New serial dies began at approximately 80801 EL; with this, the letter suffix changed from embossed to flat.
	Fire Department		Red serial on white; Red state name centered at top; Gradient red band at bottom with 'Fire Department' centered in white	F/V 12-345 (variable number of digits)		
	Flat Weight Truck - D Truck	1930	Black serial on white with faded Lincoln graphic; Green cursive state name centered at top; Green slogan centered at bottom	From 1 D to 123456 D	1 D to 555694 D (as of May 18, 2026)	New plates were issued annually until 1995, when they were replaced with multi-year plates and renewed with stickers on a yearly cycle. All flat weight truck plates expire on June 30.
	Fleet Permanent		Black serial on white with faded Lincoln graphic; Green cursive state name centered at top; Green slogan centered at bottom	F/P 123456 (variable number of digits)	F/P 1001 to F/P 305127 (as of May 18, 2025)	Used on rental cars, fleet telecom vans and delivery vehicles. New serial dies began at approximately F/P 246000; with this, the stacked letters changed from embossed to flat.
	Medical Carrier	1990	Black serial on white with faded Lincoln graphic; Green cursive state name centered at top; Green slogan centered at bottom	123 MC; 1234 MC	100 MC to present	New serial dies began at approximately 10000 MC; with this, the MC letters changed from embossed to flat.
	Medical Carrier	1990	Black serial on white with faded Lincoln graphic; Green cursive state name centered at top; Green slogan centered at bottom	12345 MC	100 MC to present	New serial dies began at approximately 10000 MC; with this, the MC letters changed from embossed to flat.
	Motorcycle	2003	Similar to 2001 Abraham Lincoln passenger base	AB 1234	AA 101 to GE 2085 (as of April 26, 2025)	Letters I, O and Q not used.
	Municipal Police		Dark blue serial on white; Blue state name and slogan centered at top; Blue gradient band at bottom with 'Municipal Police' centered in white	M/P 12 345 (variable number of digits)	M/P 10 to M/P 25 335 (as of April 28, 2025)	
	Public Transportation	1990	Black serial on white with faded Lincoln graphic; Green cursive state name centered at top; Green slogan centered at bottom	1234 PT; 12345 PT	1001 PT to 26336 PT (as of July 3, 2026)	
	School Bus	1967	Black serial on white with faded Lincoln graphic; Blue cursive state name at top	1234 SB; 12 345 SB	1001 SB to 122 004 S/B (as of April 4, 2026)	New plates were issued every two years until 1995, when they were replaced with multi-year plates and renewed with stickers on the same two-year cycle. New serial dies began at approximately 119 000 S/B; with this, the stacked letters changed from embossed to flat.
	School Bus	1967	Black serial on white with faded Lincoln graphic; Blue cursive state name at top	123 456S/B	1001 SB to 122 004 S/B (as of April 4, 2026)	New plates were issued every two years until 1995, when they were replaced with multi-year plates and renewed with stickers on the same two-year cycle. New serial dies began at approximately 119 000 S/B; with this, the stacked letters changed from embossed to flat.
	Semi-Trailer	ca. 1976	Green serial on white	1234 S/T; 12 345S/T; 123 456S/T; 1234567S/T	1 S/T to 1032416S/T (as of September 25, 2025)	Plates were replaced annually through 1998. Starting in 1999, semi trailer plates are issued on a permanent basis (no renewal sticker required).
	Tinted Windows	2009	Black serial on 2001 passenger base	10 000 WT	10 000 WT to 12 387 WT (as of November 5, 2025)	Plates are issued to individuals with a medical condition requiring tinted windows.

== Temporary registration permits ==
=== 1914 to 1982 ===
The use of "License Applied For" windshield signs or similar devices can be traced back to at least 1914. Their use is likely back to 1911 when Illinois first began to provide state issued license plates. Defacing the signs was not taken lightly, and fines were handed out for tampering with them in even the most minor way. In 1933 many new cars were seen in Chicago without the required sign. There is little evidence of the use of "License Applied For" signs throughout the 1940s, 1950s, and 1960s, but no other system of temporary vehicle registration is known for these decades. In the early 1970s Illinois vehicle owners were again receiving a small piece of cardboard with the words "License Applied For" to be taped to the inside of the vehicle's windshield until their license plates arrived in the mail. These signs continued to be issued until the early 1980s.

=== 1983 to 2000 ===
By 1983 this had transitioned to a Temporary Registration Permit on blue banknote paper for state residents that purchased new or used cars. These permits were supposed to be displayed in the lower right corner of the windshield. If new plates did not arrive in the mail within 60 days, the permit could be renewed. State residents who privately purchased a new or used vehicle were required to place a copy of their registration application in the lower right corner of the windshield and place a copy of the bill of sale in the lower left window. There has never been a charge for these permits.

Each of these permits had a unique number at the bottom left hand corner. In 1984 a prefix was added to the permit number so that the location of where the permit was obtained could be identified. The following prefixes were used: B for agents of the Secretary of State; CX for currency exchanges; DL for Illinois vehicle dealers; and RM for licensed remittance agents.

A revised permit form and new codes were used beginning in 1986. The primary change to the form was the expiration date went from being the same size as most of the text on the form to becoming the prominent feature with characters at least 1 inch (2.5 cm) in size. The acronym "EXP" (expires) immediately proceeded the Month, Day, and Year boxes at the top of the form. This change provided much better visibility of when a temporary permit expired. The revised codes were CUR for currency exchanges; DLR for Illinois vehicle dealers; MVS for agents of the Secretary of State; and REM for licensed remittance agents. The code and the unique serial number continued to appear at the bottom of the form.

By 1993 this system had been changed to an orange Temporary Registration Permit that showed both a large expiration date and a large temporary registration number. This paper tag was three inches wide by eight inches long, and it was supposed to be displayed in the back window of the vehicle. Problems with this permit, as well as the previous blue permit, were that they could easily be altered, their small size made them difficult to read, the numbers were not entered into police databases of plate numbers, and with the increased popularity of tinted windows the orange permits were often nearly invisible to other motorists, pedestrians, and the police. Originally these permits were valid for 60 days, but circa 1998 the length of time they could be used was extended to 90 days.

In June 1998 it was announced that new Temporary Registration Permits would begin to be issued in March 1999. Stickers, the size of regular license plates, were to be placed in the same location as normal plates. They were designed to be difficult to alter, would shred if moved, and therefore could not be transferred to another vehicle. This system was never implemented, and it wasn't until June 2001 that the orange temporary permitting form was replaced with an entirely revised permitting system. The last of the orange permits did not expire until December 31, 2001.

=== 2001 to present ===
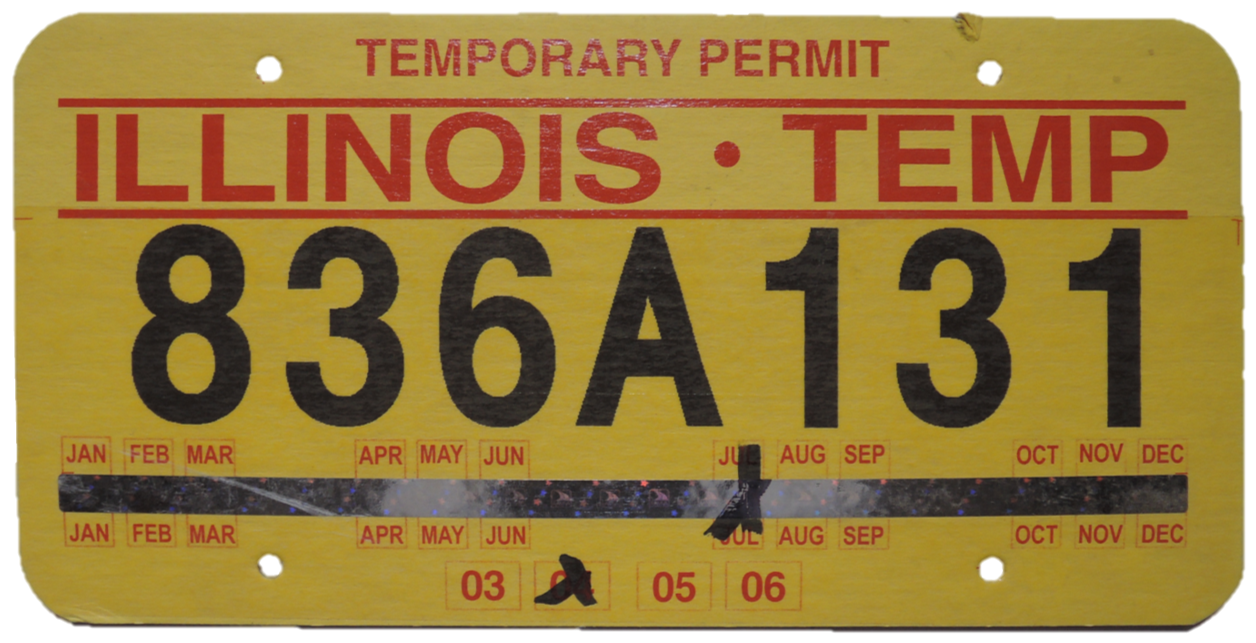
2004 temporary registration permit

"Responding to complaints that temporary vehicle tags help criminals escape detection, Secretary of State Jesse White announced a $2 million program [on] Tuesday [June 19, 2001] to introduce tamper-proof temporary license plates that will allow police to know the identity of vehicle owners." He also called the black on yellow permit design, "One of the finest devised by man." These tags were the size of regular license plates, they incorporated a hologram in a strip across the entire plate, they had numbers the same size as a regular license plate, and they were immediately entered into law enforcement databases upon being issued. The expiration date was under a clear film to make them tamper-proof. Plates were valid for 90 days, which was the same length as the old system, and only a single permit for the rear of the vehicle was issued. The first day of issue was June 12, 2001 with these earliest permits being distributed to drivers license facilities, auto dealers, and currency exchanges.

The main problem with the new temporary permit, which remain in use today and are colloquially known as a temporary plate, is that the cardboard plate easily darkens when it gets wet, usually from rain, snow, or car washes, and consequently many begin to look old when left attached to a vehicle for as few as 30 days. Changes to the design since being issued include the format of the serial number being updated (see below), the plates red lettering has been revised, the state seal has been removed, and the boxes that indicate the month of expiration have been separated into four different groups. Regular updates to the year boxes are necessary to keep the plates current. All vehicle types use this temporary registration permit with the exception of motorcycles and mopeds which use a smaller permit with a slightly modified format than the standard permit.

Initially the format used for the permit was the same as that of a passenger car license plate: three numbers followed by a space and then four more numbers (123 4567). For motorcycles and mopeds the format was three numbers followed by a space and then three more numbers (123 456). This led to there sometimes being the same number on both a permanent registration and a temporary registration. Eventually the inevitable mix-up happened, and a person with a permanent plate was pulled over for having the serial number of a temporary plate which was being looked for by the police. The proliferation of vanity plates and specialty plates, like the Environmental and Prevent Violence plates, some of which also carried the same serial number sequence as regular passenger plates, was also of concern.

The confusion caused by duplicate serial numbers led to a format change on the permits in the spring of 2003. The new format for passenger permits consisted of three numbers, a letter, and three more numbers (123 A 456); the format for motorcycle and moped plates was similar but with two numbers before the letter instead of three (12 A 345). In both cases, T was the first letter used, followed by A, B, C etc., with I, O and Q skipped. With the introduction of the new formats, the red state seal between the sets of characters was removed.

Starting in late 2020, a revised tag design was introduced along with a new serial format (123 AA 456). The previous format reached as high as 561 V 749 before the change.

== Specialty plates ==
In addition to regular passenger plates, Illinois offers a large variety of specialty plates to include plates for colleges, professional sports teams, law enforcement, hunting (sporting), medical research, and many other causes. The cost of each set of plates differs depending on the type of plate and the required donation amount to annually display these plates.

Image	Type	First issued	Serial format	Serials issued	Notes
	Agriculture	2009	1234 A/G	1000 A/G to present	
	Alzheimer's Association	2018	1234 D/A	1000 D/A to present	
	America Remembers	2002	1234 A/R	1000 A/R to present	
	Chicago Bears	2011	123 B/D; 1234 B/D; 12345 B/D	100 B/D to present	
	Chicago Bulls	2011	123 B/U; 1234 B/U; 12345 B/U	100 B/U to present	
	Chicago Cubs	2011	123 C/C; 1234 C/C; 12345 C/C	100 C/C to present	
	Chicago White Sox	2011	123 W/S; 1234 W/S; 12345 W/S	100 W/S to present	
	Environmental	1994	E1234; E12345; E123456	E1000 to present	The baseplate design and serial format changed in 2011, in order for the state to issue standard passenger plates beginning with the E prefix, which occurred around 2016. Motorists who elected to retain their plate number received the new baseplate with their existing 4-, 5-, or 6-digit numeric serial followed by the new E/N suffix.
	Environmental	2011	1234 E/N; 12345 E/N; 123456 E/N	1000 E/N to present	The baseplate design and serial format changed in 2011, in order for the state to issue standard passenger plates beginning with the E prefix, which occurred around 2016. Motorists who elected to retain their plate number received the new baseplate with their existing 4-, 5-, or 6-digit numeric serial followed by the new E/N suffix.
	Firefighters Memorial	1996	123 F/F; 1234 F/F; 12345 F/F	100 F/F to 99999 F/F	
	Firefighters Memorial	2019	1A 234F/F	1A 100 to 9A 999, 1B 100 to 1J 088 (as of December 27, 2023)	This is only the second type of Illinois plate to intermingle numbers and letters. The other type is the Temporary Registration Permit.
	Pan Hellenic - Alpha Kappa Alpha	2023	1234 A/K	1001 A/K to present	Pan Hellenic specialty plates are offered with the choice of nine fraternities/sororities. Fees benefit children, the underprivileged, and older adults as well as educational and civic events in Illinois.
	Pan Hellenic - Alpha Phi Alpha	2023	1234 P/A	1001 P/A to present	Pan Hellenic specialty plates are offered with the choice of nine fraternities/sororities. Fees benefit children, the underprivileged, and older adults as well as educational and civic events in Illinois.
	Pan Hellenic - Delta Sigma Theta	2023	1234 D/S	1001 D/S to present	Pan Hellenic specialty plates are offered with the choice of nine fraternities/sororities. Fees benefit children, the underprivileged, and older adults as well as educational and civic events in Illinois.
	Pan Hellenic - Kappa Alpha Psi	2023	1234 K/A	1001 K/A to present	Pan Hellenic specialty plates are offered with the choice of nine fraternities/sororities. Fees benefit children, the underprivileged, and older adults as well as educational and civic events in Illinois.
	Pan Hellenic - Omega Psi Phi	2023	1234 Q/U	1001 Q/U to present	Pan Hellenic specialty plates are offered with the choice of nine fraternities/sororities. Fees benefit children, the underprivileged, and older adults as well as educational and civic events in Illinois.
	Pan Hellenic - Phi Beta Sigma	2023	1234 P/B	1001 P/B to present	Pan Hellenic specialty plates are offered with the choice of nine fraternities/sororities. Fees benefit children, the underprivileged, and older adults as well as educational and civic events in Illinois.
	Pan Hellenic - Sigma Gamma Rho	2023	1234 S/R	1001 S/R to present	Pan Hellenic specialty plates are offered with the choice of nine fraternities/sororities. Fees benefit children, the underprivileged, and older adults as well as educational and civic events in Illinois.
	Sporting Series - Deer	1997	1234 S/W	100 S/W to present	
	State Police Heritage Foundation	2014	1234 H/F	1001 H/F to present	
	Veteran - Army	2008	123 G/I; 1234 G/I; 12345 G/I	100 G/I to present	
	Veteran - Bronze Star	1983	B/Z 123; B/Z 1234	B/Z 100 to present	
	Veteran - Bronze Star	2006	123 B/Z; 1234 B/Z; 12345 B/Z	100 B/Z to present	In 2006, B/Z was moved from prefix to suffix, to match the convention of the other types of veteran plates.
	Veteran - Universal	1997	123 U/S; 1234 U/S; 12345 U/S	100 U/S to present	The plate features the words “Illinois Veteran” encircling the State of Illinois. Decals are issued to personalize the plate with a specific branch of service or theater of action, if desired. In 2003, Illinois began to issue veteran plates on the new Veteran-specific base seen here. Prior to 2003, Universal Veteran plates were issued on the 1997 base above, and all other veteran plates were issued on the 1983 passenger base (with a red header instead of blue).
	Veteran - Universal	2003	123 U/S; 1234 U/S; 12345 U/S	100 U/S to present	The plate features the words “Illinois Veteran” encircling the State of Illinois. Decals are issued to personalize the plate with a specific branch of service or theater of action, if desired. In 2003, Illinois began to issue veteran plates on the new Veteran-specific base seen here. Prior to 2003, Universal Veteran plates were issued on the 1997 base above, and all other veteran plates were issued on the 1983 passenger base (with a red header instead of blue).
	Veteran - Vietnam	2006	123 V/N; 1234 V/N; 12345 V/N	100 V/N to present	
	Wildlife Prairie Park	1996	123 W/P; 1234 W/P	100 W/P to present	

== Special Event plates ==
Special Event plates are available to civic organizations and other groups. The event must be open to the public and it must promote the interests of Illinois citizens. Plates may be displayed for the 60 days prior to the last day of the event and the basic cost per set of two plates is $10. The full cost of the plate is determined by the number of colors, and at least 50 sets of plates must be ordered. The Illinois Secretary of State must approve the design of all plates.

Image	Type	Design	Serial format	Serials issued	Notes
	1987 Midwest Governor's Conference	White on pale blue			Used for 30–60 days.
	1992 World Columbian Stamp Exposition	Pale blue on white			
	1992 LPGA Chicago Challenge	Black on yellow			Used for 30–60 days.
