= Flexible printing =

Flexible printing may refer to:

- Sign printing, of vinyl banners
- Flexography, a form of printing process which utilizes a flexible relief plate
- Flexible printing, of printed circuit boards in flexible electronics
