= Digital printing =

Method of printing

Digital printing is a method of printing from a digital-based image directly to a variety of media. It usually refers to professional printing where small-run jobs from desktop publishing and other digital sources are printed using large-format and/or high-volume laser or inkjet printers.

Digital printing has a higher cost per page than more traditional offset printing methods, but this price is usually offset by avoiding the technical steps required to make printing plates. It also allows for on-demand printing, short turnaround time, and even a modification of the image (variable data) used for each impression. The savings in labor and the ever-increasing capability of digital presses means that digital printing is reaching the point where it can match or supersede offset printing technology's ability to produce larger print runs of several thousand sheets at a low price.

== Process ==
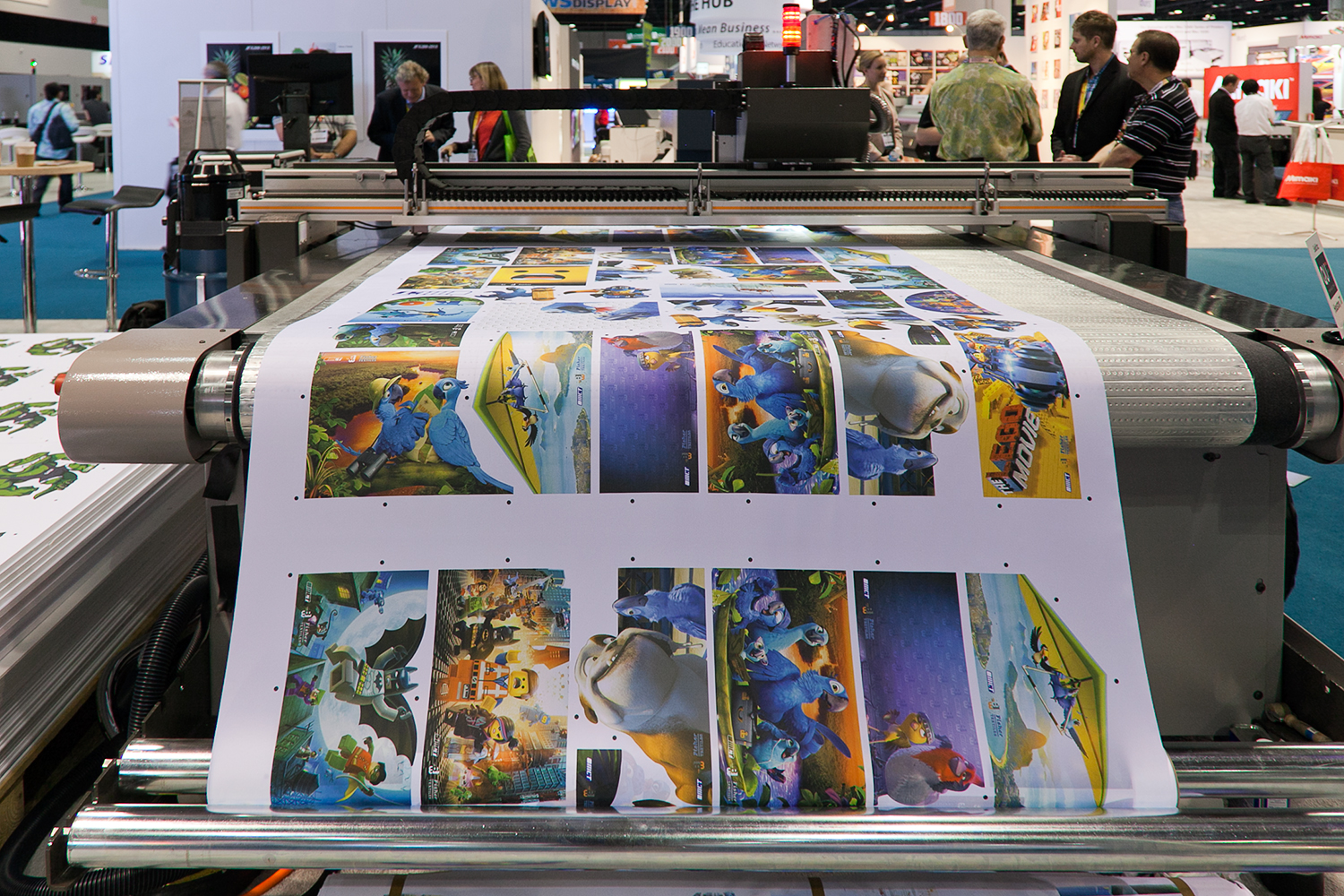
Large format digital prints

The greatest difference between digital printing and analog methods, such as lithography, flexography, gravure, and letterpress, is that in digital printing (introduced in the 1980s) there is no need to replace the printing plate, whereas in analog printing the plates are repeatedly replaced. This results in quicker turnaround time and lower cost in digital printing, but typically a loss of detail in most commercial digital printing processes. The most popular methods include inkjet and laser printers, which deposit pigment and toner, respectively, onto substrates, such as paper, canvas, glass, metal, and marble.

In many of the processes, the ink or toner does not permeate the substrate, as does conventional ink, but forms a thin layer on the surface that may be additionally adhered to the substrate by a fuser fluid with thermal (toner) or ultraviolet curing (ink).

== Digital printing methods of note ==
=== Fine art inkjet printing ===
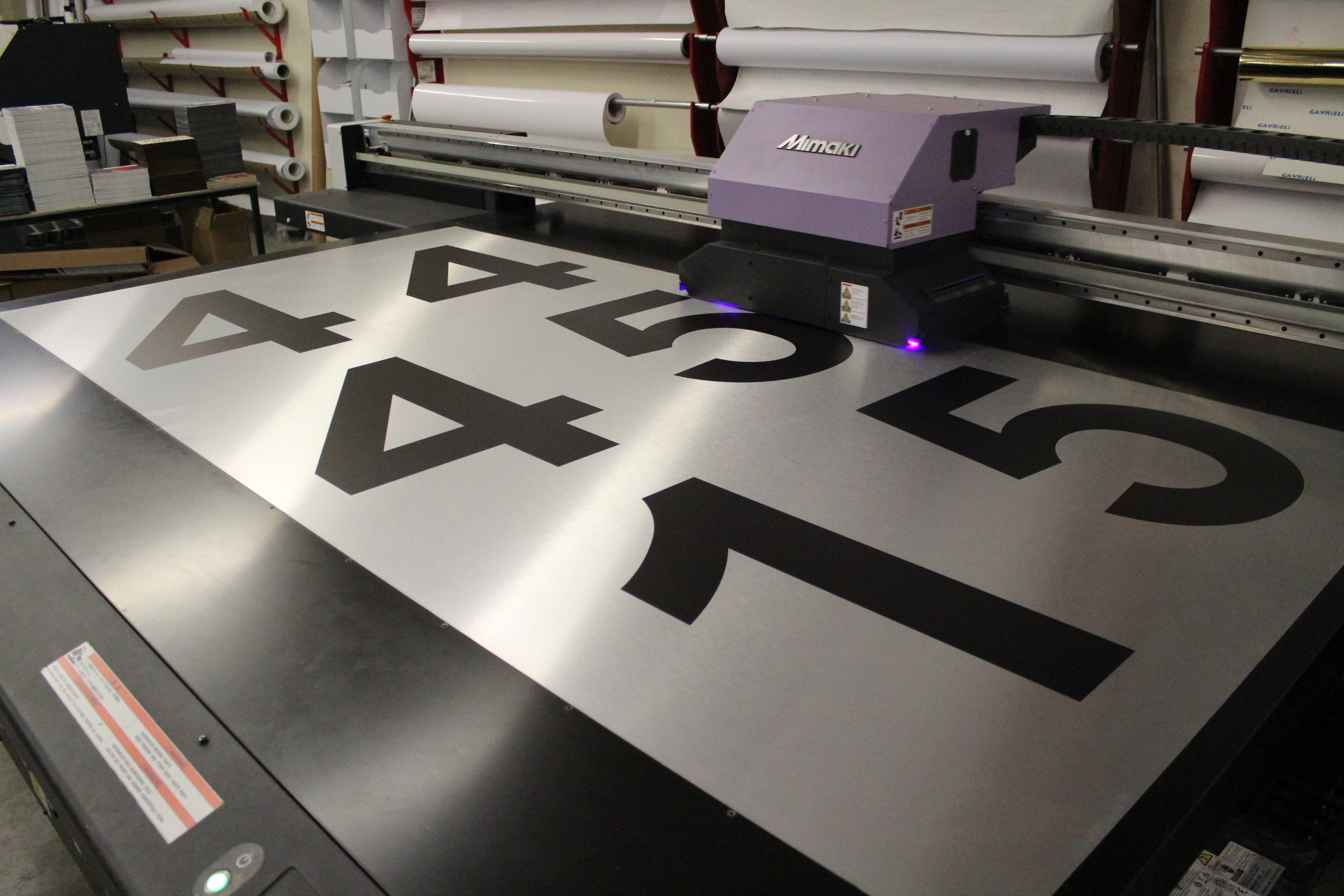
Large format printing of black numbers on a brushed aluminum sheet by a Mimaki inkjet printer

Fine art digital inkjet printing is printing from a computer image file directly to an inkjet printer as a final output. It evolved from digital proofing technology developed by Kodak, 3M, and other major manufacturers, with artists and other printers trying to adapt these dedicated prepress proofing machines for fine-art printing. There was experimentation with many of these types of printers, the most notable being the IRIS printer, initially adapted to fine-art printing by programmer David Coons, and adopted for fine-art work by Graham Nash at his Nash Editions printing company in 1991. Initially, these printers were limited to glossy papers, but the IRIS Graphics printer allowed the use of a variety of papers that included traditional and non-traditional media. The IRIS printer was the standard for fine art digital printmaking for many years, and is still in use today, but has been superseded by large-format printers from other manufacturers such as Epson and HP that use fade-resistant, archival inks (pigment-based, as well as newer solvent-based inks), and archival substrates specifically designed for fine-art printing.

Substrates in fine art inkjet printmaking include traditional fine-art papers such as Rives BFK, Arches watercolor paper, treated and untreated canvas, experimental substrates (such as metal and plastic), and fabric.

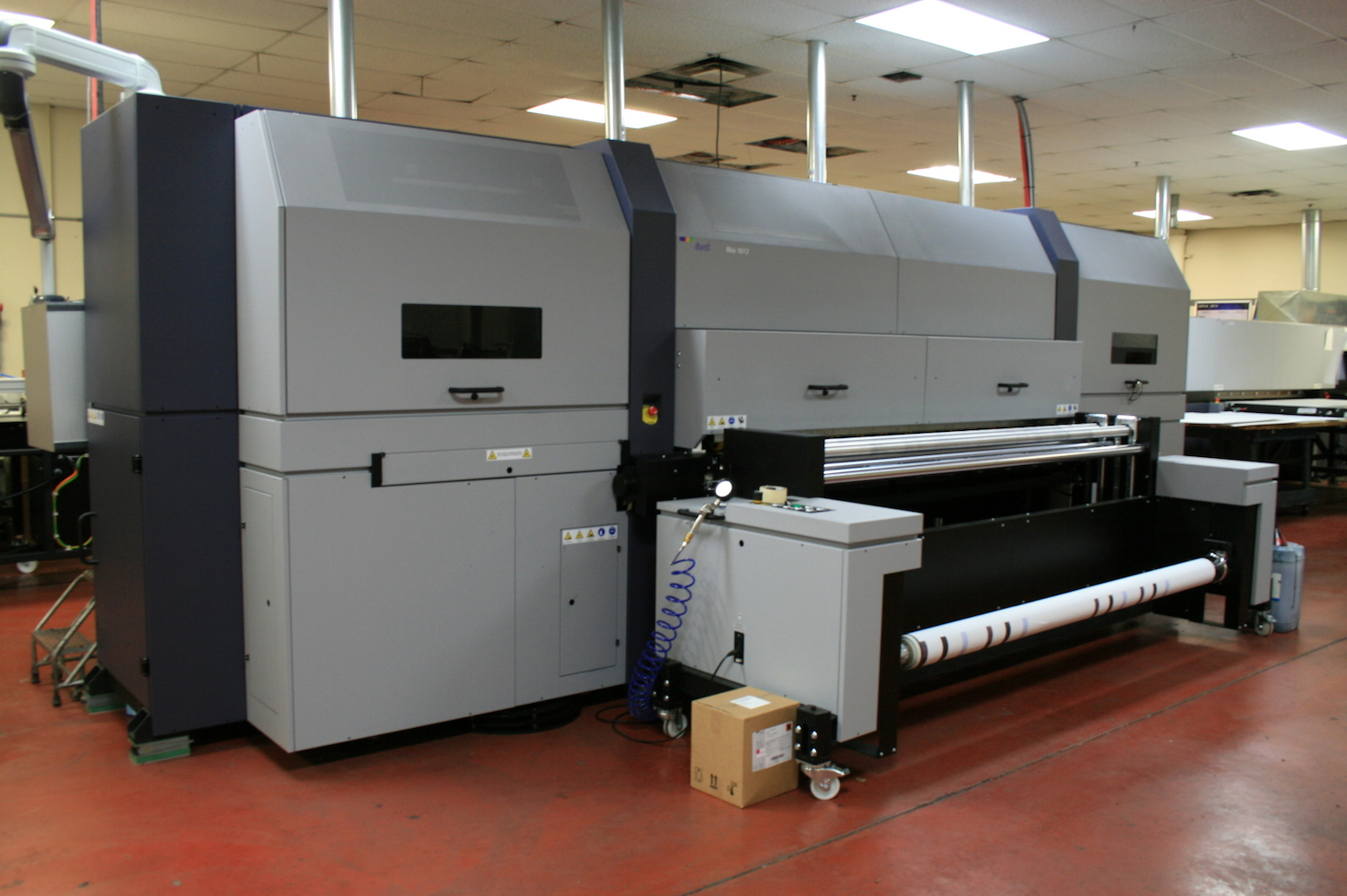
Digital Printing Press

For artists making reproductions of their original work, inkjet printing is more expensive on a per-print basis than the traditional four-color offset lithography, but with inkjet printing, the artist does not have to pay for the expensive printing-plate setup or the marketing and storage needed for large four-color offset print runs. Inkjet reproductions can be printed and sold individually as demand dictates. Inkjet printing has the added advantage of allowing artists to take total control over the production of their images, including final color correction and the substrates used, with some artists owning and operating their own printers.

Digital inkjet printing also allows the output of digital art in all forms, as finished pieces or as elements in a further art piece. Experimental artists often add texture or other media to the surface of a final print or use it as part of a mixed-media work. Many terms for the process have been used over the years, including "digigraph" and "giclée". Thousands of print shops and digital printmakers now offer services to painters, photographers, and digital artists worldwide.

Digital images are exposed onto true, light sensitive photographic paper with lasers and processed in photographic developers and fixers. These prints are true photographs and have continuous tone in the image detail. The archival quality of the print is as high as the manufacturer's rating for any given photo paper used. In large format prints, the greatest advantage is that, since no lens is used, there is no vignetting or corner detail distortion.

=== Digital cylinder printing ===
Digital cylinder printing is when a machine directly lays ink onto a curved surface, usually the wall of an object with a circular cross-section and a constant, tapered, or variable diameter. Digital cylinder printing is a method of reproducing black-and-white or full-color images and text onto cylindrical objects, typically promotional products, using digital imaging systems.

The digital process is, by definition, faster than conventional screen printing, because it requires fewer production steps and less setup time for multiple colors and more complex jobs. This, in turn, enables reduced run lengths.

The ability of digital cylinder printing machines to print full color in one pass, including primers, varnishes, and specialty inks, enables multiple design techniques, which include:

- Mirror prints: viewable on the inside and outside of glass or plastic
- Tone on tone: solid matte-finished substrate enhanced with one ink or clear coat
- Stained glass: color opaque enough to see through
- Contouring
- Etched

Full-wrap cylindrical printing also benefits from seamless borders with no visual overlap. For ease of print file preparation, original design artwork should be able to be imaged on cylinders and tapered items without the need for manipulation or distortion; i.e., flat images will print to scale on a curved surface, with software automatically making the adjustment. The more advanced systems available on the market can handle these requirements.

The digital cylindrical printing process involves inserting a cylinder-shaped item or part into a fixture that securely holds it in place. The part then travels under a print head mechanism, where tiny droplets of CMYK (cyan, magenta, yellow, and black) inks are released in a specific pattern to form an image. Typically, one part is printed at a time and can take 8 to 45 seconds to complete, depending on the artwork's complexity and quality. It is then finished with a UV coating to add a glossy finish and protect it from abrasion.

There are three imaging techniques used by digital cylinder printing machines: multi-pass, single-pass, and helical printing.

Multi-Pass: Multi-pass printing is when the print heads or printed object move axially in steps down the part, like a flatbed printer. The move time is inefficient and can lead to stitching artifacts between moves.

Single Pass: Single pass uses an array of print heads to print the full image length in a single revolution of the printed object. Different colors are usually printed at different stations, leading to higher costs, increased complexity, and greater sensitivity to print nozzle dropouts.

Helical Printing: Helical printing is a hybrid method between the single-pass and multi-pass approaches. Image data is mapped to allow continuous imaging in a helical pattern with a limited number of print heads. Users can optimize the print resolution, speed, and curing controls to optimize image quality or choose higher speed if quality isn't critical. Tapers can be imaged at high speed and curved vessels can be managed through the range of controls offered.

Items that can be printed using digital cylindrical processes include cups, tumblers, thermos bottles, makeup containers, machine parts, carrier tubes, pens, tubes, jars, and others.

== Applications ==
Digital printing has many advantages over traditional methods. Some applications of note include:

- Desktop publishing – inexpensive home and office printing is only possible because of digital processes that bypass the need for printing plates
- Commercial – Business Stationery - Including business cards, letterheads
- Variable data printing – uses database-driven print files for the mass personalization of printed materials
- Fine art – archival digital printing methods include real photo paper exposure prints and giclée prints on watercolor paper using pigment based inks.
- Print on Demand – digital printing is used for personalized printing for example, children's books customized with a child's name, photo books (such as wedding photo books), or any other books.
- Advertising – often used for outdoor vinyl banners and event signage, in trade shows, in the retail sector at point of sale or point of purchase, and in personalized direct mail campaigns.
- Photos – digital printing has revolutionized photo printing in terms of the ability to retouch and color correct a photograph before printing.
- Architectural Design – new media that conforms to a variety of surfaces has enabled interior and exterior spaces to be transformed using digitally printed wall murals and floor graphics.
- Sleeking – The process of adding foil, holographic effects or even glossy and dull finishes by way of digital ink adhesion. This is done by digitally printing a rich black area where the user wants the sleeking to take place. The machine registers this and only adheres to this specific area.

== See also ==
- Color management
- Computer to film
- Computer to plate
- Digital ceramic printing on glass
- Digital embossing
- Digital image processing
- Digital photography
- Display device
- Flatbed digital printer
- Frescography
- Output device
- PODi
- Society for Imaging Science and Technology (IS&T)
- Tonejet
- Translight
- Variable Data Printing
- Weave (digital printing)
