= Digital embossing =

Digital embossing is a digital printing technology enhancement process. Digital embossing eliminates the need for printing plates, molds, chemicals, and solvents. The process emits no pollutants or waste and reduces energy use. The high resolution inkjet technology enables selective coating with variable thickness and stampless embossing. Digital embossing allows for on-demand printing of as few as one item in thousands of copies.

Digital embossing was invented by Scodix, an Israel-based startup company that produces equipment for print enhancement applications in the commercial and packaging industries. Digital embossing enhancement technology was first unveiled at IPEX 2010 on the Scodix1200™ UV DigitalEmbossing™ press.

Digital embossing can be specified by different print modes.

== Preparation ==
The preparation for digital embossing requires an additional black separation from the image. The accuracy of the process (each sheet is registered optically before printing) enables embossing of complex shapes.

== Production time ==
Digital embossing typically adds two minutes to printing production time.

== See also ==
- Embossing
