= Tonejet =

Beverage cans printed using Tonejet inkjet technology

Tonejet is a drop-on-demand inkjet printing technology that enables the direct digital deposition of printing ink onto substrates. The Tonejet digital printing process is targeted at commercial and industrial applications.

Tonejet was first disclosed in Patent Cooperation Treaty publication WO 93/11866 dated June 24, 1993, with the inventor named as Luis Lima-Marques assigned to Research Laboratories of Australia Pty. Ltd., in Adelaide, Australia. A number of patents relating to the technology, including United States Patent 6,260,954, have been granted. Research Laboratories of Australia formed a partnership with The Technology Partnership plc, a technology and product development company from the UK, to add hardware development expertise. Tonejet now has its headquarters in Cambridge, UK.

== Process ==
The Tonejet process is an electrostatic drop-on-demand deposition technology that enables high-quality images to be printed onto virtually any type of absorbing or non-absorbing substrate at high speed. The Tonejet process consists of electrostatic concentration and ejection of particles from a fluid. The Tonejet print head enables an electric field to be applied to the ink. The Tonejet ink is a key part of the ejection process; it consists of electrically charged conventional pigments in a non-conductive liquid. In the Tonejet printhead, an electric force is applied directly to the charged ink particles. The longer the electric pulse is applied, the more ink is ejected. The Tonejet ejection process concentrates the ink prior to ejecting the droplets onto the substrate, with continuous greyscale control. The Tonejet printhead is a three-dimensional structure consisting of side walls, flow channels and ejectors. An ink meniscus is formed between the side walls and the ejector. The Tonejet printhead is therefore a simple, nozzleless, open structure.

== Commercial products ==
In late 2007, Tonejet announced that it had produced the world's widest integral printhead for use in an industrial printer. The 172 mm (6.8 in) wide printhead would enable the vast majority of food and drink packaging to be printed in a single pass, thereby bringing substantial logistics and cost savings to the packaging industry.

In 2008, Ball Packaging Europe announced that in cooperation with Tonejet, they would supply individually designed beverage cans using the Tonejet process with photo quality, 600 dpi resolution.

In June 2010, Air Berlin launched its own line of beverage cans after becoming the first customer for Ball Packaging Europe's technology co-operation with Tonejet. There is some interest particularly in printing cans for the craft beer market.

== See also ==
- Inkjet technology
