= Banner-making =

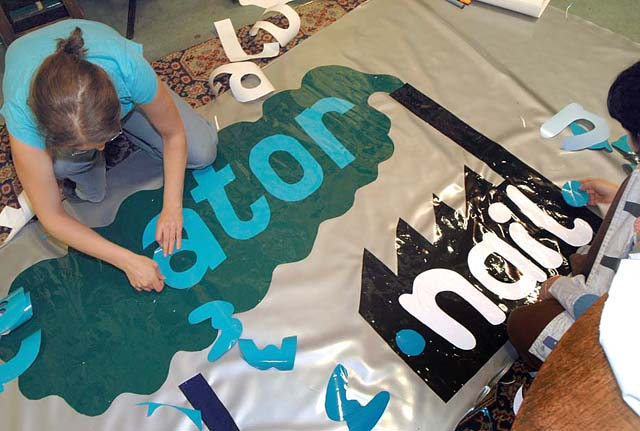
Nottingham based arts activist collective The Mischief Makers make banners using reclaimed sticky back plastics

Banner-making is the ancient art or craft of sewing banners. Techniques used include applique, embroidery, fabric painting, textile printing, patchwork and many others. Banners are a versatile art form and can be made out of many artistic and craft methods, with its modern 'do-it-yourself' culture being fondly embraced alongside the celebration of professional banner-makers of the past and present.

The carrying, displaying and making of banners has strong links with political and protest movements, particularly in trade unions, due to their main job - conveying a message and inspiring onlookers to understand a protest action's motives.

== Symbolism ==
There are many traditional symbols that can be found in banners including clasped hands, flaming torches, beehives, scales, and many others. Some were self explanatory while others referred to a shared history that had been (or would be) overcome. Another common visual on banners would be of scenes or people representative of past events or current struggles.

There were also many designs and icons used from the Bible (e.g. David slaying Goliath), from heraldry or from popular tradition, e.g. the "all-seeing eye", or symbols of truth, hope or justice.

Colour symbolism has its own long history and is also integrated into banner-making to communicate. A strong example of this comes from the Suffragettes who used colour in banners and many other methods to portray the values of their movement; purple for dignity, white for purity, and green for hope. The magazine Votes for Women declared: "Wear the colours as a duty and a privilege. Never be seen without your badge."

The importance of symbolism and colour use cannot be understated; banners are often trying to get across important messages to people who may only be able to spare a five second glance. Easily understood messaging and short slogans are considered the strongest methods of conveying messages in banner-making.

== Historic banner-making ==
Banners of AUT, NATFHE, Cambridge TUC and Cambridge University Students' Union

=== Trade Unions ===
Even pre-1824 when trade unions were not legal, banners would be produced and taken to meetings. They would be hung or laid over tables at secret meetings, and once legal unions would take them out into parades, protests and celebrations.

In the United Kingdom, the first of these banners were commonly painted by local signwriters, coachpainters or decorators. More often than not, they were made by a member of the local branch who was considered to be artistic. There are also examples of different workers collectives supporting each other by making another's banners in the People's History Museum's collection.

From 1837 onwards, more than three quarters of banners in regular use were made by the firm of George Tutill of Chesham, Buckinghamshire. All of their banners were made from pure silk woven by Huguenots in London. At the height of banner production there were said to be 17,000 looms in operation. The silk was stretched taut over a wooden frame and coated with India rubber, and the oil colours applied to it were 'old', i.e. had been standing around for a while. This allowed the paint to dry quickly and to make it more pliant or elastic.

While the trade union movement are pioneers of banner-making, they should not be considered the sole contributors to the art form. In addition to a history of church banners, there are many influential banners from a variety of social movements, with a contemporary example being Pride marches across the world.

=== Quilted Banners ===
Feminist groups have championed quilting and other diverse textiles within banner-making, both utilising a technical skill and reclaiming what was considered to be women's work. The Suffragettes are considered to have championed more diverse textile use in banner-making and

While not specifically banner-making, it would be remiss not to reference the role of textiles in the Underground Railroad, a secret network helping enslaved peoples escape to freedom. Quilts would be hung outside of homes that had covert references, also called quilt codes or freedom quilts, which gave directions and information to those on their journey. Contemporary quilt makers pay homage to these codes and include them in works today. These codes and techniques certainly passed on knowledge that was subsequently used in feminist textile protest banners.

Another honorable mention should be given to the UK AIDS Memorial Quilt, a living memorial to remember and celebrate the lives lost to HIV from the beginning of the pandemic to the present day. Each section of the quilt is made for an individual who died and is rich with their personality, often in addition to important symbolism of the LGBT movement surrounding the AIDS pandemic.

=== Present ===
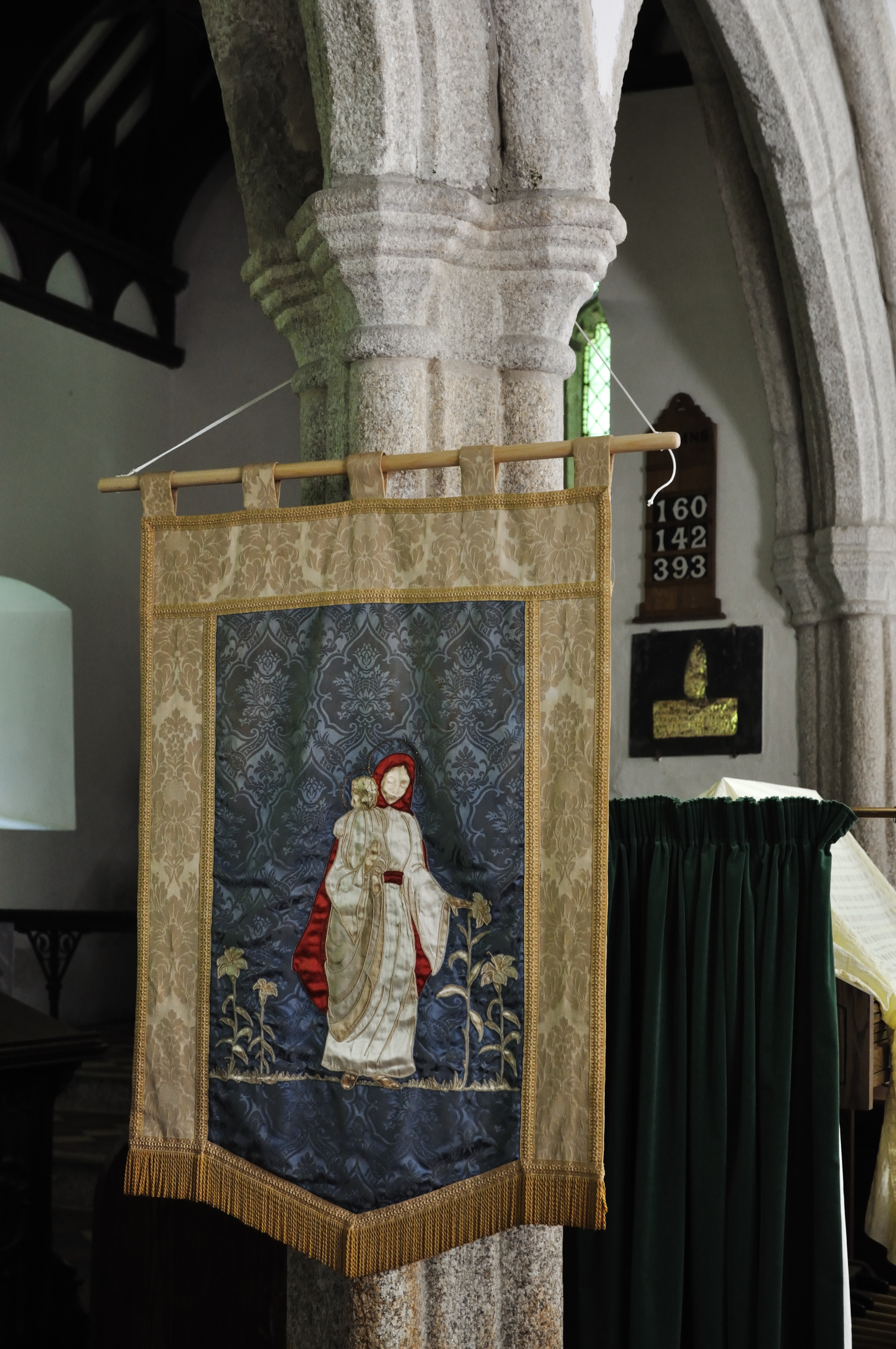
St Materiana depicted on the church banner at Minster, Cornwall

In the United Kingdom, trades union banners lost their popularity following successful campaigns against unions from Conservative governments, and many banners subsequently languished in damp cellars or lofts. Additionally, a large number of trade union mergers meant that many banners no longer had the correct union name on and became obsolete. There are special museums which restore, preserve and exhibit trade union banners, including the People's History Museum in Manchester and Beamish Museum in the North East.

In recent years the interest in these banners has been rekindled and many books, videos, and exhibits have been produced to help people rediscover and celebrate impacts of banner-making. Durham Miners Gala is considered to be the largest current parade of trade union banners and hand painted banners are still made in Durham by the Durham Bannermakers, in addition to other makers around the United Kingdom. Makers of traditional banners are in decline in the United Kingdom which has come to attention of the national charity Heritage Crafts.

In contemporary movements, banners are less common but still spotted in crowds and celebrated. Individuals are more likely to make their own signage at home and bring something smaller and more easily carried. There has been an embracing of home made protest art using materials such as cardboard, recycled correx, or other sturdy materials that can be carried. They will usually have slogans as the primary focus of the signage with some colour or imagery.
