= Banner =

Flag or other piece of cloth bearing a symbol, logo, slogan or other message

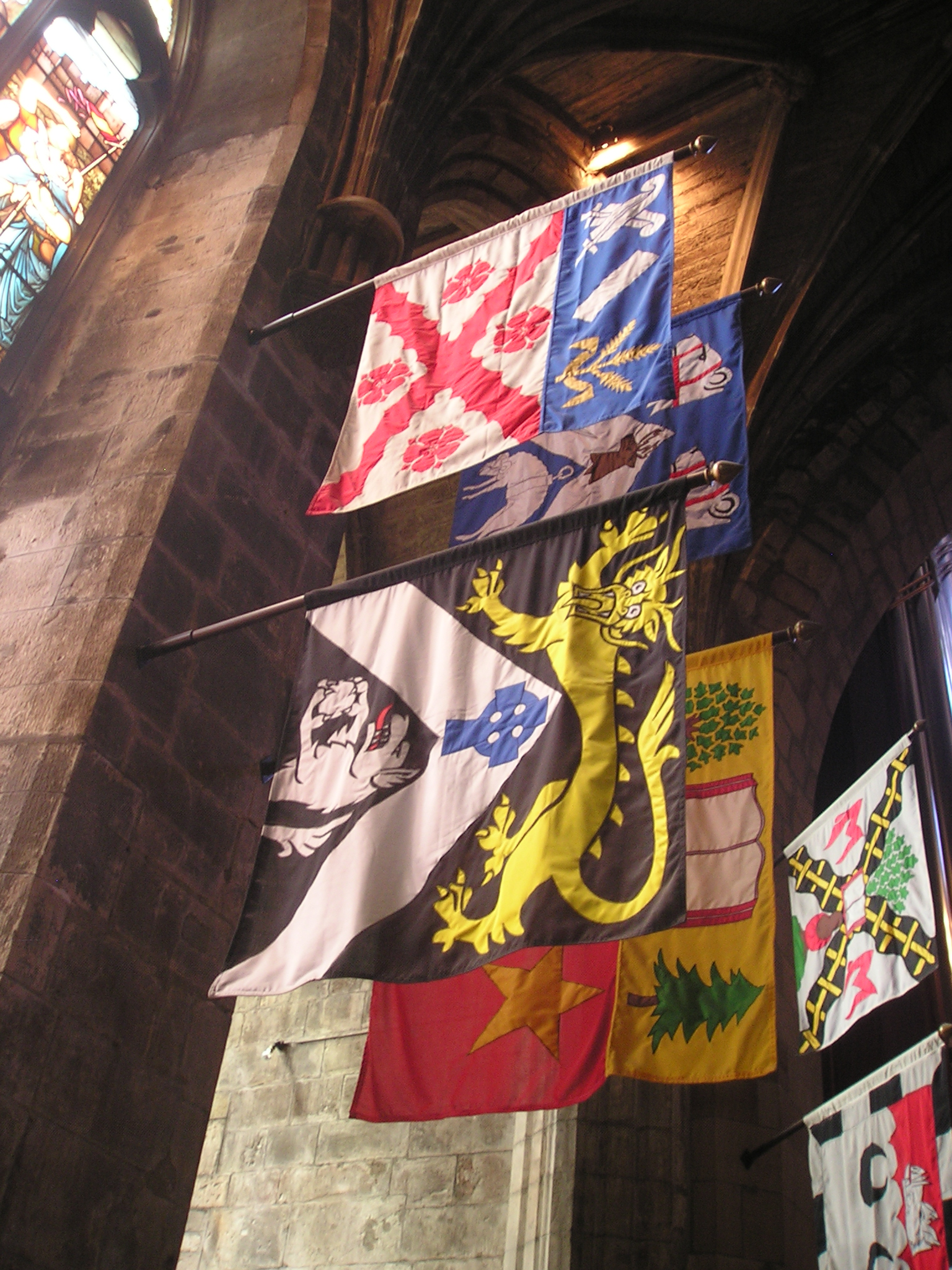
Banners of Knights of the Thistle displayed in St Giles' Cathedral

A banner is a flag or another piece of cloth bearing a symbol, logo, slogan or another message. A flag whose design is the same as the shield in a coat of arms (but usually in a square or rectangular shape) is a banner of arms. A bar-shaped piece of advertising material sporting a name, slogan, or other marketing message is also a banner. Banners may hang from horizontal or vertical flagpoles, be stretched between two poles, be attached to windows or buildings, or be towed behind aircraft.

Banner-making is an ancient craft. Church banners commonly portray the saint to whom the church is dedicated.

The word derives from Old French baniere (modern French: bannière), from Late Latin bandum, which was borrowed from a Germanic source (compare Gothic: 𐌱𐌰𐌽𐌳𐍅𐌰, romanized: bandwa). Cognates include Italian bandiera, Portuguese bandeira, and Spanish bandera.

== Vexillum ==
The vexillum was a flag-like object used as a military standard by units in the Ancient Roman army.

The word vexillum itself is a diminutive of the Latin velum, meaning a sail, which confirms the historical evidence (from coins and sculpture) that vexilla were literally "little sails" i.e. flag-like standards. In the vexillum the cloth was draped from a horizontal crossbar suspended from the staff; this is unlike most modern flags in which the 'hoist' of the cloth is attached directly to the vertical staff.

== Heraldic banners ==
A heraldic banner, also called a banner of arms, displays the basic coat of arms only: i.e. it shows the design usually displayed on the shield and omits the crest, helmet or coronet, mantling, supporters, motto or any other elements associated with the full armorial achievement (for further details of these elements, see heraldry). A heraldic banner is usually square or rectangular.

A distinction exists between the heraldic banner and the heraldic standard. The distinction, however, is often misunderstood or ignored. For example, the Royal Standard of the United Kingdom is in fact a banner of the royal arms.

The full armorial achievement of the arms of the Kingdom of Scotland (before the Union of the Crowns)

The arms as depicted on the escutcheon

"The Lion Rampant": the banner of the King of Scots

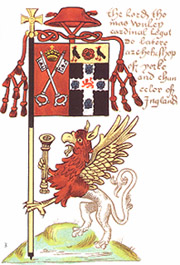
Banner of Cardinal Wolsey

Banner of Lincoln

Banner of the British Broadcasting Corporation

== Banners in Christianity ==
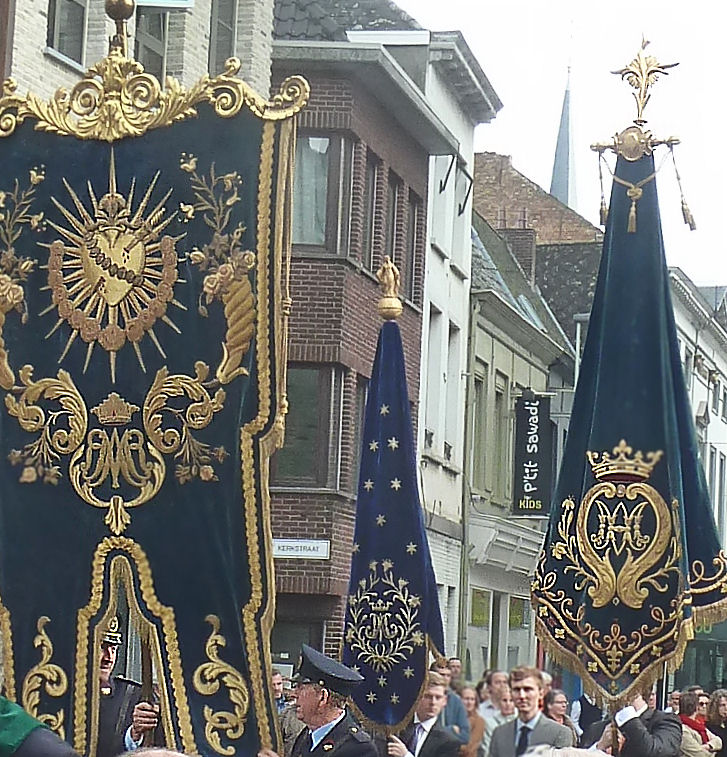
Religious banners of Catholic brotherhoods in Lier, Belgium

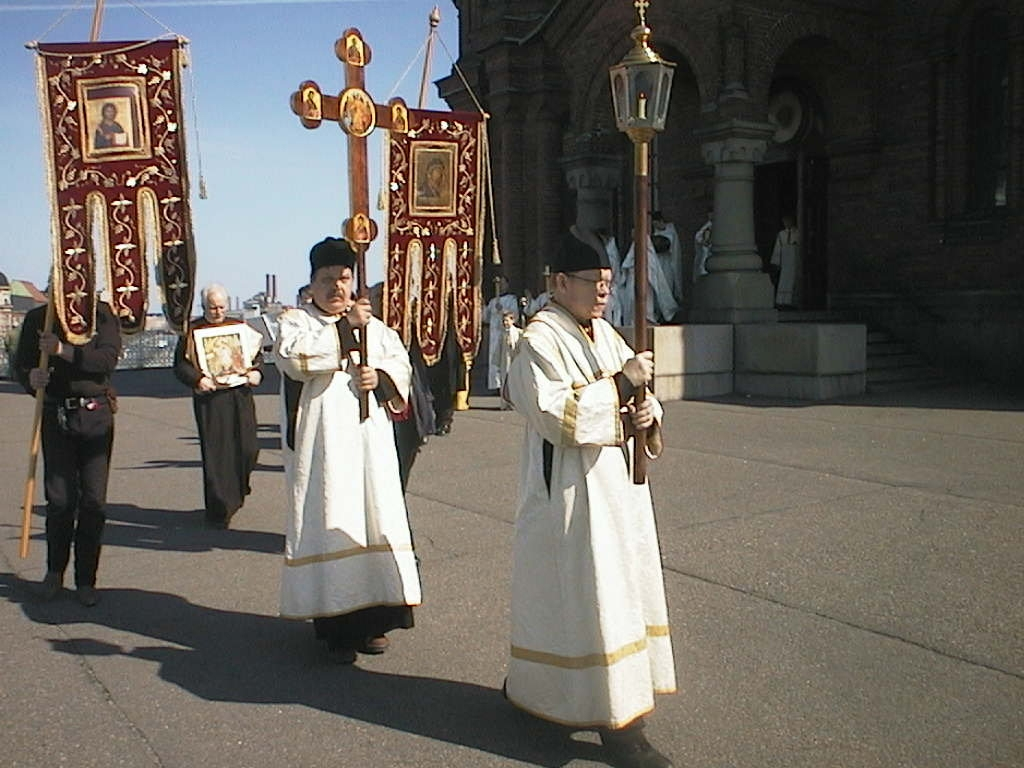
Russian Orthodox Crucession with lantern, processional cross and Khorugvi (banners).

In the Old Testament, the prophet Isaiah was commanded to raise a banner and exalt his voice (Isaiah 13:2). Habakkuk received a similar order to write a vision upon tables that could be read by one who runs past it (Habakkuk 2:2).

Banners in churches have, in the past, been used mainly for processions, both inside and outside of the church building. However, the emphasis has, in recent years, shifted markedly towards the permanent or transient display of banners on walls or pillars of churches and other places of worship. A famous example of large banners on display is Liverpool R.C. Cathedral, where the banners are designed by a resident artist.

Banners are also used to communicate the testimony of Jesus Christ by evangelists and public ministers engaged in Open Air Preaching.

== Trade union banners ==
Banners of AUT, NATFHE, Cambridge TUC, and Cambridge University Students' Union.

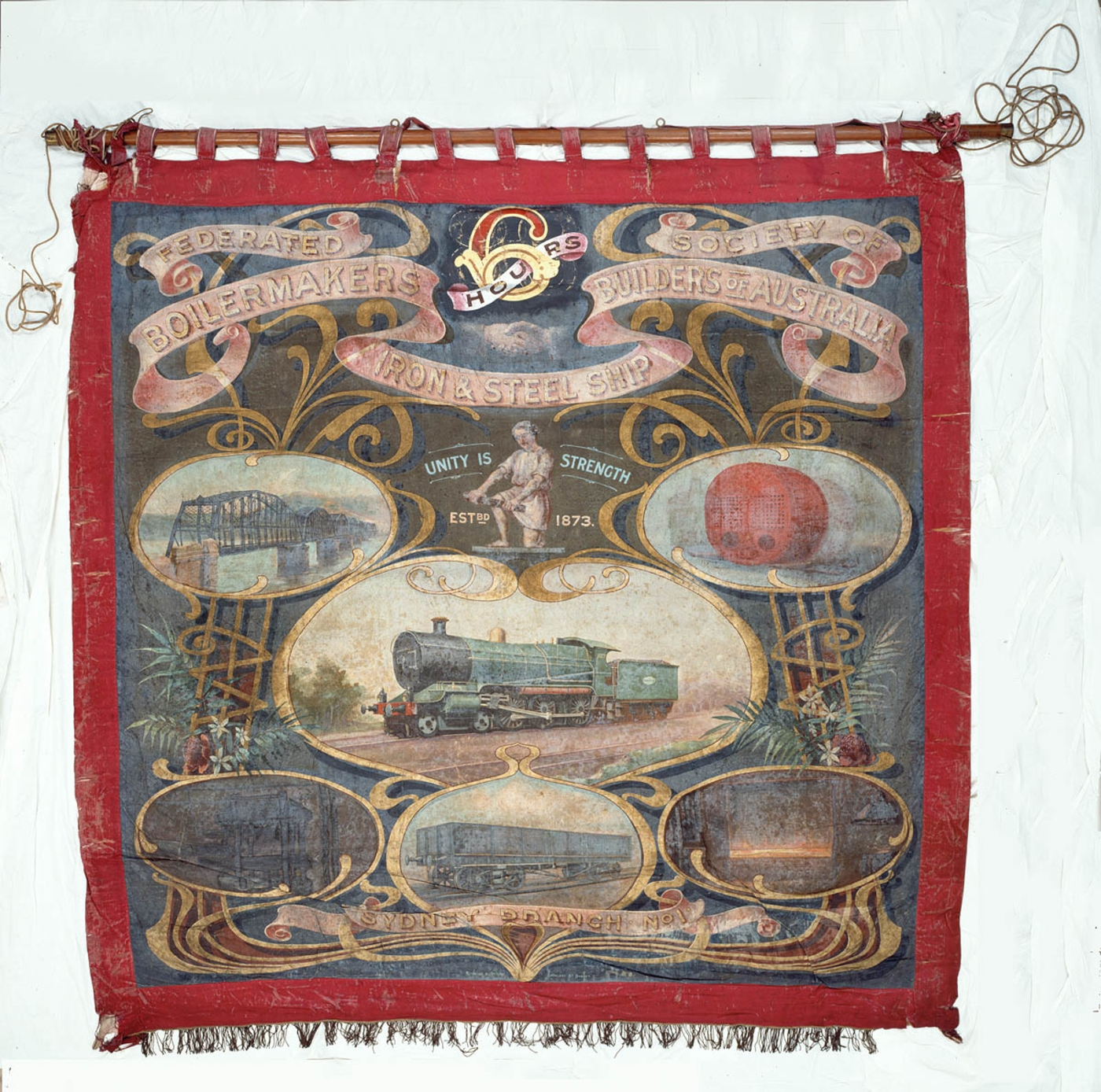
Federated Society of Boilermakers, Iron & Steel Shipbuilders of Australia, Union Banner A928321h

The iconography of these banners included mines, mills, and factories, but also visions of the future, showing a land where children and adults were well-fed and living in tidy brick-built houses, where the old and sick were cared for, where the burden of work was lessened by new technology, and where leisure time was increasing. The same kind of banners are also used in many other countries. Many, but not all of them, have red as a dominant colour.

In Australia in the late nineteenth and early twentieth centuries, trade union banners were unfurled with pride in annual Eight Hour Day marches which advocated 'Eight Hours Labour, Eight Hours Recreation and Eight Hours Rest'. These marches were one of the most prominent annual celebrations staged in Australia by any group. In Sydney alone, by the early twentieth century, thousands of unionists representing up to seventy different unions would take part in such parades, marching behind the banner emblematic of their trade. Most of these banners have not survived; the Labour Council of NSW has the largest surviving collection at Sydney Trades Hall in Sussex Street, Sydney.

The State Library of NSW in Sydney has a small collection of trade union banners that were donated to the Library in the early 1970s such as a Federated Society of Boilermakers, Iron & Steel Shipbuilders of Australia banner thought to have been made c. 1913–1919. The Federated Society of Boilermakers, Iron & Steel Shipbuilders of Australia was formed in 1873 and joined the Amalgamated Metal Workers Union in 1972.

The banner features a kneeling figure in the centre surrounded by scroll work and is decorated with Australian native flowers and images representative of the work of the Union's members such as a New South Wales Government Railways 34 class steam locomotive, the Hawkesbury River rail bridge built in 1889, and a furnace. The reverse of the banner shows the warship Australia at sea. The banner is canvas and was painted by Sydney firm Althouse & Geiger, master painters and decorators. Founded in 1875, the company is still in operation. The banner is a powerful interpretive tool in communicating the experience and the history of the Australian labour movement.

== Sports banners ==
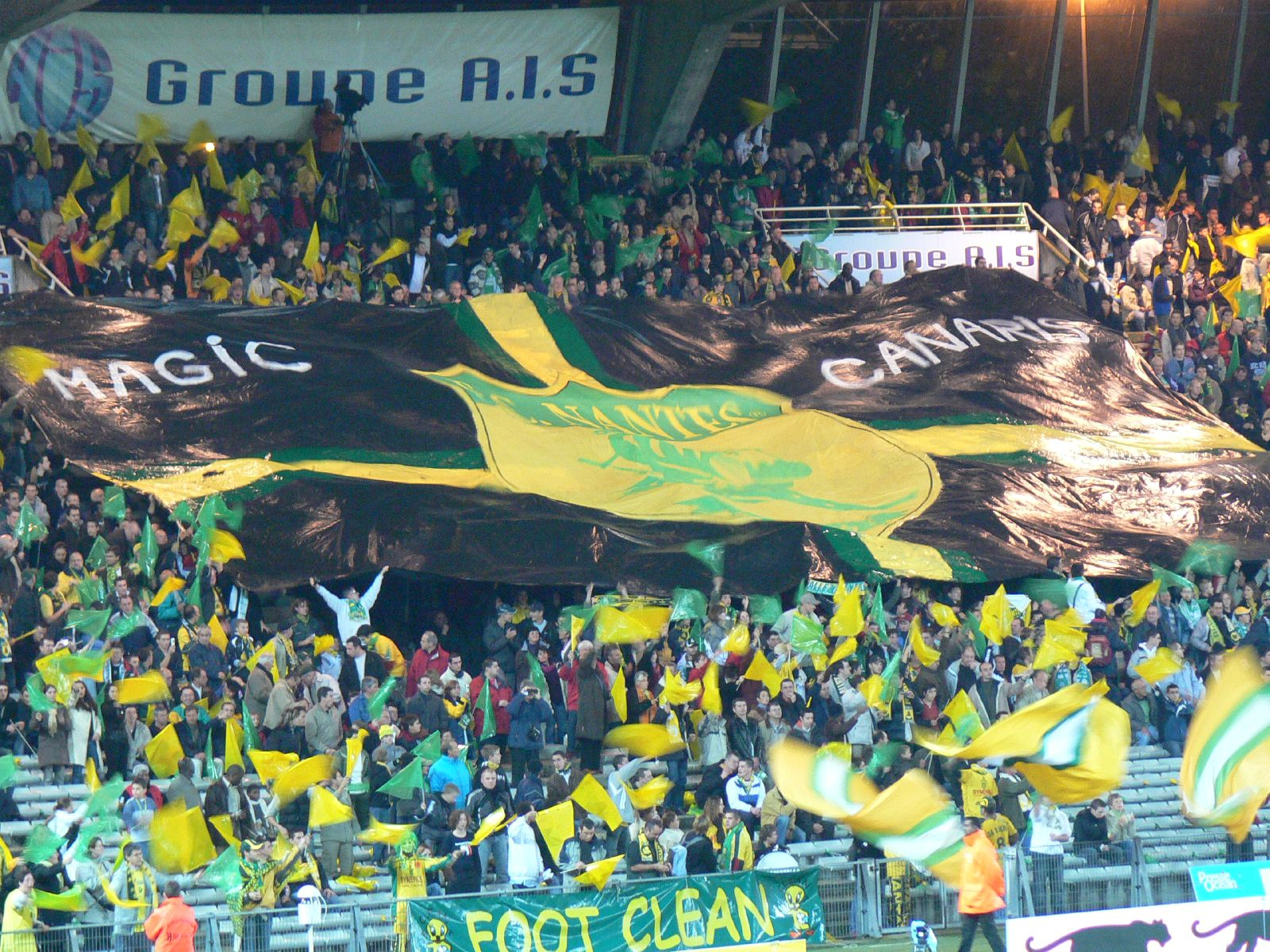
FC Nantes banner

Sports fans often buy or make banners to display in the grandstands. Team banners typically contain the logo, name or nickname, motto and the team colors. Banners on individual competitors can contain a picture or drawing of the player. Sports banners may also honor notable players or hall-of-fame athletes and commemorate past championships won. These types of sports banners are typically hung from rafters in stadiums and arenas. In North American indoor professional sports, the previous season's champion traditionally does not install their awarded championship banner until moments prior to their first home game of the season that follows, in a ceremony that is chiefly referred to as "raising the banner".

Uruguay's Club Nacional de Football supporters made a 600 x 50 metre banner that weighs over 2 tonnes; they claim it is the largest in the world. It was unveiled in April 2013 in a Copa Libertadores football match at the Estadio Centenario.

Rally towels serve some bannerlike cultural functions.

== Advertising banners ==
Advertising banners are often vinyl or fabric printed on ultra-wide format inkjet printers using solvent inks and ultraviolet-curable inks.

Banners are used by businesses for advertising. Many British towns and cities have numerous banners decorating their city centers, advertising the town or its special features and attractions. Pre-printed banners are commonly used, simple, and accessible. Banners can be printed in enormous formats, with a full range of colors. They are used in many configurations: hanging from an existing fixture, fixed to a wall, or free standing. When an advertising banner is hung or suspended between posts, grommets or another method of attachment are necessary to prevent the banner from tearing or flying away. Aluminum grommets can be pre-installed, or punched into the banner and used to tie the banner down, allowing for more durable advertisements. Another common form of free standing banners are retractable displays.

Banners can be found plastered behind a window screen, as billboards, atop skyscrapers, or towed by airplanes or blimps.

Another manifestation of advertising banners, unique to the 21st century, are "banner ads", which are advertisements on websites. The banner ads contain hyperlinks to other websites. Also, on free music streaming services such as Spotify and Pandora, audio advertisements will play in between songs. One of the common tag lines is "Click the banner to learn more."

== Big letter banners (China) ==
In China, it is common to find large red coloured banners, especially in schools, factories, government institutions and construction sites. Also called da zi bao (Chinese: 大字报; pinyin: dàzìbào; lit. 'big-character reports'), these tend to be big and long, usually with red backgrounds and large Chinese characters. They tend to have motivational messages or industrial milestones on them. Historically, these big-character posters were used to convey messages during the cultural revolution, but their use changed after the country's liberalization since 1979.

== See also ==
- Banners in Northern Ireland
- County Clare in Ireland is known as the Banner County.
- Flag
- Gonfalone
- Heraldic standard
- Jolly Roger
- Knight Banneret
- Nobori
- Pennon or pennant
- Sashimono
- Stainless Banner
- The Star-Spangled Banner
- Umbul-umbul, type of Indonesian banner or flag
- Vexillum
- Vertical banner
- Vinyl banners
- Web banner
