= Weave (digital printing) =

Weaving is a technique used in digital printing to reduce visual bands resulting from the proximity of adjacent print nozzles. Horizontal rows are printed out of order and "weaved" together with subsequent passes of the print head.
