= Weaving (surname) =

Weaving is a surname.

Those bearing it include:

- Jon Weaving (1931–2011), Australian musician
- Hugo Weaving (born 1960), British-Australian actor
- Samara Weaving (born 1992), Australian actor and model
- Leslie Charles Frederick Weaving (born 1941), Canadian gold miner
