= Translight =

A Translight or Translite is a large illuminated film backing typically used as a backdrop in the film and TV industry. The name of Translite originally came from the black-and-white display film made by the Eastman Kodak Company. Pacific Studios in Los Angeles was the sole producer of Translites from about 1950 until about 1979. Technicians there projected images in a darkroom onto the film in strips, which were then removed and processed by hand in tanks by the darkroom crew. The strips were seamed with tape; then oil paint was applied to the assembled picture for a tinted color effect. The name gradually was applied to any transparency lit from behind and used as a background picture for feature films or television production. Full-color printing of a Translight was first used on the motion picture One from the Heart (1982).

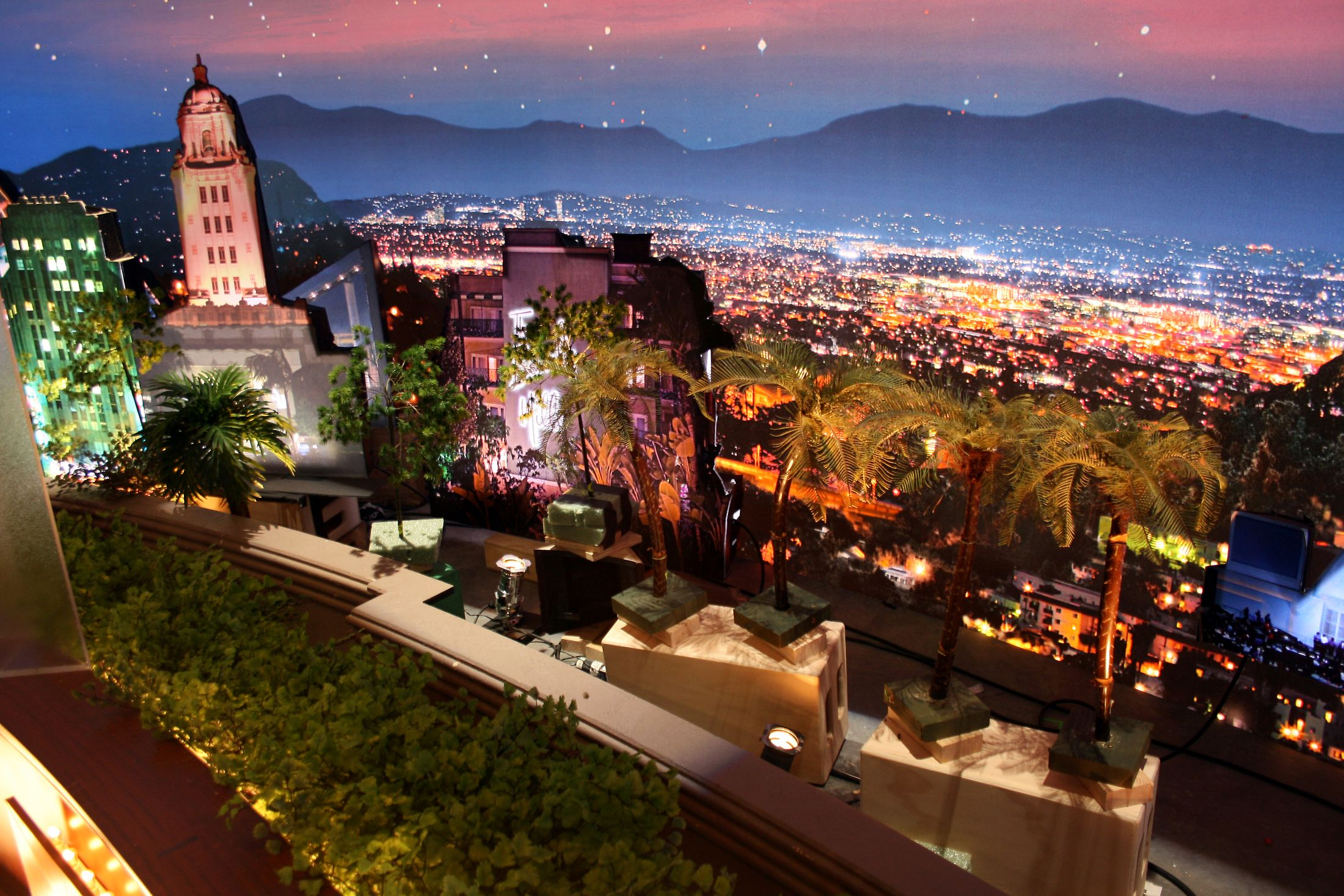
Illuminated cityscape backdrop with miniatures in front on the set of a late night television show.

Until recently, Translights were made in a photographic process, often in sections to allow very large sizes to be produced. Digital technology has now been introduced, which allows large sizes to be printed with fewer seams. As of 2010, Translights can be printed on photographic film by laser exposure with the Lambda printer, on polyvinyl chloride with inkjet printers of grand scale, and on muslin with water-based inks. The polyvinyl-chloride production process has been seen by some as environmentally harmful because of the off-gassing of chlorine from the film, the lack of a biodegradable printing base, and the release of dioxin into the environment during raw material production.

Translights allow the director of photography to create what appears to be an exterior scene, but under controlled conditions, rather than dependent on weather, access, and time of day. The images extend a set. Because the image is captured during principal photography, no post-production is required. A translight gives the filmmaker the ability to do, for example, multiple takes of a scene against a sunset, instead of shooting on location.

A further development of this technology is the "day-to-night" Translight. In this case, one side of the film is printed with the daytime image and the reverse side is printed with the night time scene, both images are perfectly aligned. With a change in the direction of illumination, the director of photography can change between daytime and night time scenes with no requirement for re-rigging. This type of Translight does not photographically reproduce the scene at night, for the daytime image remains somewhat visible.

In 2011, Translite3 was introduced. It uses the same polyester-base film as is used for Duratrans, but is available in a wider format. Two significant improvements are that it allows the application of additional diffusion in the printing process, solving the see-through problem of Duratrans, and does not require matte coating with lacquer, as is needed with Duratrans. It is also more scratch-resistant than its predecessor.

== See also ==
- Matte painting
