= Douglas pine =

Douglas pine is a common name for several plants which may refer to:

- Pinus gordoniana (syn. P. douglasiana), a species of pine native to western Mexico
- Pseudotsuga menziesii, a species of douglas-fir native to large areas of western North America and introduced to other temperate areas, more usually known as Douglas-fir
