= Vinyl banner =

Vinyl banners are flexible banner signs made from PVC sheeting. They are commonly used for outdoor advertising and temporary signage, and are typically printed with a wide-format printer and finished with hems and grommets for mounting.

== Materials ==
The weights of the different banner substrates range from 9 oz/sq yd (310 g/m^{2}) to 22 oz/sq yd (750 g/m^{2}), and may be double- or single-sided. Large banners are usually manufactured with a special mesh material that is UV and wind resistant.

== Printing ==
Common types include:

- Digitally printed banners: printed directly with large-format printers.
- Vinyl lettered banners: produced by applying individual elements cut from self-adhesive vinyl by a computer-driven vinyl cutter.
- Screenprinted: in which different colors are laid down one at a time using screens comprising an imaged stencil, through which the screen printing ink passes.
- Painted: hand-painted graphics and lettering.

== Finishing ==
A vinyl banner usually uses an outside hem to ensure that grommets can be secured properly. If grommets are fastened through a single layer rather than through the hem (double layer), they can rip out more easily; hemming provides a stronger grip and durability, particularly outdoors. Banner hem tapes are also used as decorative trim and to prevent delamination and lifting of vinyl hems.

== See also ==
- Banner
- Outdoor advertising
- Digital printing
- Screen printing
- Vinyl cutter
