= Flatbed digital printer =

Type of digital printer

Flatbed digital printers, also known as flatbed printers or flatbed UV printers, are printers characterized by a flat surface upon which a material is placed to be printed on. Flatbed printers are capable of printing on a wide variety of materials such as photographic paper, film, cloth, plastic, pvc, acrylic, glass, ceramic, metal, wood, leather, etc.). Flatbed digital printers usually use UV curable inks made of acrylic monomers that are then exposed to strong UV-light to cure, or polymerize them. This process allows for printing on a wide variety of surfaces such as wood or canvas, carpet, tile, and even glass. The adjustable printing bed makes it possible to print on surfaces ranging in thickness from a sheet of paper often up to as much as several inches. Typically used for commercial applications (retail and event signage), flatbed printing is often a substitute for screen-printing. Since no printing plates or silkscreens must be produced, digital printing technology allows shorter runs of signs to be produced economically. Many of the high-end flatbed printers allow for roll-feed, allowing for unattended printing.

Environmentally, flatbed digital printing is based on a more sustainable system than its commercial predecessor of solvent printing as it produces fewer waste cartridges and less indoor air pollution. The resolution of flatbed printers range from 72 DPI (dots per inch) to about 2400 DPI. One of the advantages of a flatbed printer is its versatility of printable materials although this is limited to only flat materials and occupies a lot of surface area.

== "Hybrid" Flatbed Digital Printers ==
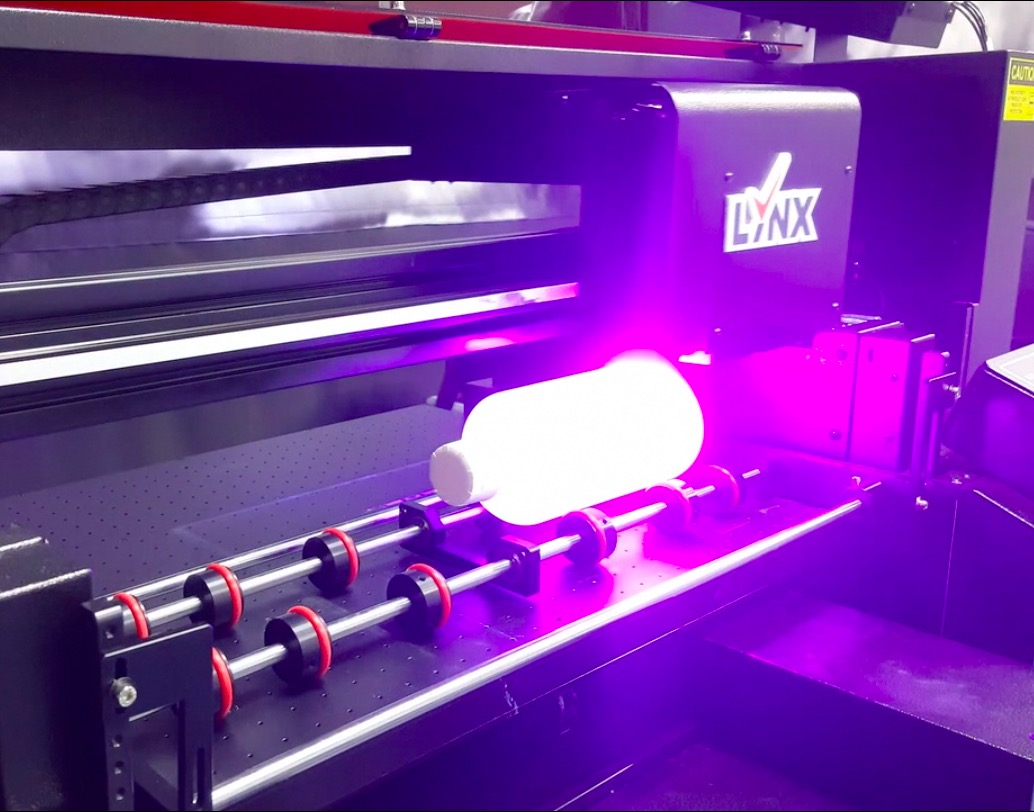
Example of a flatbed UV printer with a rotary attachment printing on a bottle.

Although most flatbed printers are limited to printing on flat surfaces, some are capable of printing of cylindrical objects, such as bottles and cans, using rotary attachments that position the object and rotate it while the printhead applies ink. Flatbed printers have sometimes been used to print on small spherical objects such as ping pong balls, however, the print resolution tends to decrease around the edges of the printed image due to the inkjets firing ink onto an inclined and further away surface.

Flatbed printers can sometimes execute multiple passes on a surface to achieve an 3D embossing effect. This is either done with colored inks or a clear varnish which is used to create glossy finishes or highlights on the print.

"Hybrid" UV printers may also refer to printers capable of printing of a flatbed surface as well as roll-to-roll, which enables the use of flexible substrates stored in rolls.

== See also ==
- Digital printing
- Variable Data Printing
- Digital image processing
- Graphical output device
