= Lumi =

Lumi may refer to:

== Computing ==
- Lumi (software), chemical analysis software
- Lumi masking, a technique used by video compression software
- LUMI, a supercomputer located in Finland

== Music ==
- Lumi (album), a 1987 album by Edward Vesala
- Lumi (band), a Lebanese krautrock band
- Lumi, a fictional singer for the virtual band Genki Rockets
- LUMi, a synthetic voice for the Vocaloid software

== People ==
=== Given name ===
- Lumi Athena, Marco Antonio Speck Gurrola (born 2006), Mexican singer, songwriter and record producer
- Lumi Cavazos (born 1968), Mexican actress
- Lumi Pollack (born 2009), American actress

=== Surname ===
- Harri Lumi (1933–2025), Estonian Communist politician
- Ott Lumi (born 1978), Estonian politician
- Risto Lumi (born 1971), Estonian military Lieutenant Colonel

== Places ==
- Aitape-Lumi District, Papua New Guinea
- Al-Lumi, a village in central Yemen
- Lumi, Albania, a village in NE Albania
- Lumi, Yemen, a village in central Yemen
- Lumi River (East Africa), a river in Tanzania and Kenya
- Lumi River (Zambia), a river in Zambia

== Other uses ==
- Lumi (company), a packaging supply chain company and inventor of Inkodye
- Salmo lumi, a type of fish

== See also ==
- Lumia (disambiguation)
- Lumi River (disambiguation)
