= Bradley color wheel =

Bradley Color Wheel
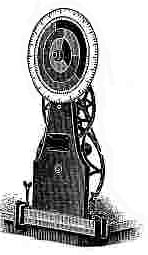
- A normal Bradley Color Wheel
- Type: Educational toy
- Inventor: Milton Bradley
- Inception: 1898
- Manufacturer: Milton Bradley
- Available: Unavailable
- Models: Normal, Primary School

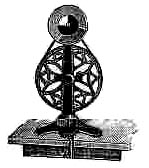
A Bradley Color Wheel aimed at primary school children

The Bradley color wheel was a line of educational tools developed by Milton Bradley, of the Milton Bradley Company (MB), in 1895 as part of his wider color teaching system. Although the color system was primarily created for education, it had a wide influence, a notable example being its usage by Smithsonian ornithologist Robert Ridgeway who, dissatisfied by contemporary color standards, incorporated the system into his own set of standards that would eventually evolve into Pantone.

The color wheel was designed to allow teachers to demonstrate how colors mixed and worked together. The wheel was based on the Maxwell Disk, a simple tool created by cutting a radial split in two or more colored disks and joining them. By doing so, colors could be mixed by rotating the disks to show a different proportion of each color. When spun, the colors would then combine to form the average color mix.

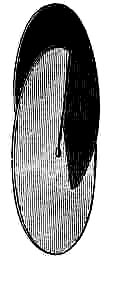
Two Maxwell Disks slotting together

The tool added a crank to rotate the wheel, graduated markings along the circumference of the disks (allowing precise color measurement) and in the center added the shade of grey required to create the color.
