= HKS (colour system) =

German colour system

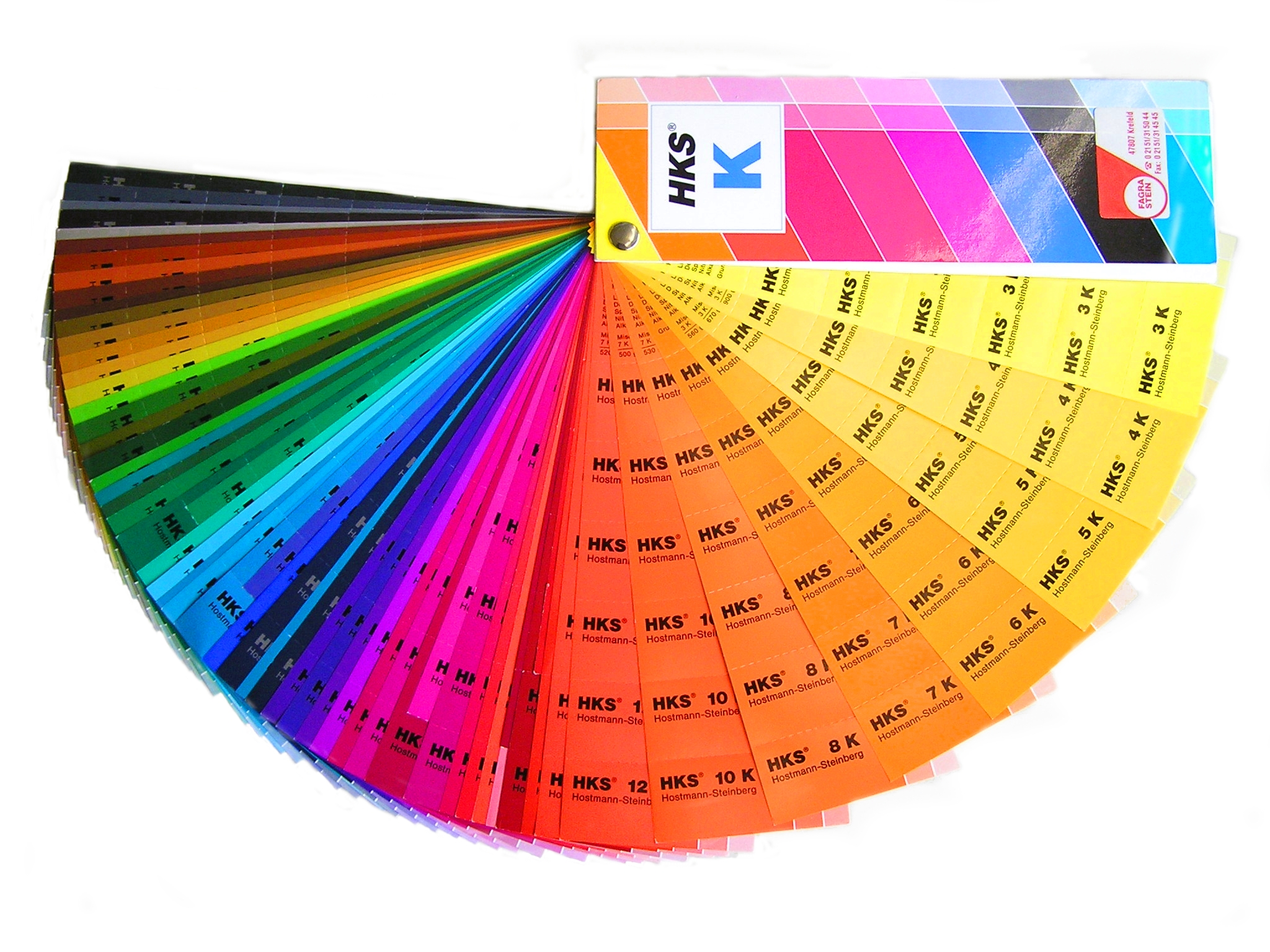
HKS colour fan.

The HKS is a colour system which contains 120 spot colours and 3520 tones for coated and uncoated paper. HKS is an abbreviation of three German colour manufacturers: Hostmann-Steinberg Druckfarben, Kast + Ehinger Druckfarben, and H. Schmincke & Co. The association of those three companies have defined the colours of the HKS system since 1968.

HKS colours, similar to Pantone colours, can be used in any kind of print publication to produce predictable colours. As in the Pantone colour system, there are HKS colours that cannot be reproduced using the CMYK color model color space, like bright orange or certain tones of blue.

The HKS colour system is based on the euroscale colourspace. It follows the guidelines of ISO 12647:2 2002 and the FOGRA Standards (such as Fogra27L). This means HKS colours are available on all paper types of the 12647 standard. This makes it easier to print the colours in offset and common digital printing technologies.
