= Cycolor =

Color printing process

Cycolor is a tradename for a color printing process that uses a special film coated with millions of capsules filled with cyan, magenta, or yellow dye precursors, acrylic monomer, and photoinitiators. When exposed to red, green, and/or blue light, the contents of the respective capsules polymerize imagewise, and therefore become hard and unbreakable. The film is then pressed against specially treated paper that will complete the dye molecule, and the capsules that have not hardened in the previous process break, releasing their contents onto the paper.

Cycolor was developed by Mead Imaging, a start-up created and funded by Mead Corporation, in the 1980s in Miamisburg, Ohio. It was based partially upon the same technology as carbonless paper, which has largely been rendered obsolete. Although the technology was very successful, the cost was significantly higher than the then emerging toner-based or ink-based systems seen today for color printing.

== See also ==
- CMYK color model
