= Specifications for Web Offset Publications =

Comparison of some RGB and CMYK colour gamuts on a CIE 1931 xy chromaticity diagram

Specifications for Web Offset Publications, invariably abbreviated to SWOP, is an organization and the name of a set of specifications that it produces, with the aim of improving the consistency and quality of professionally printed material in the United States, and of certain other products, programs and endorsements related to their work. Among other things, the organization specifies SWOP inks used in CMYK printing, colors of SWOP proofs, other physical qualities pertaining to printing. The organization publishes its own specification and ICC profile and runs a certification program.

SWOP is a non-profit volunteer organisation, and concerns itself only with the United States. In some other areas, similar efforts have been made by other organisations, taking account of national variations in printing techniques, expectations, and requirements.

Similar to SWOP is General Requirements for Applications in Commercial Offset Lithography (GRACoL) originally by Graphics Communication Association, which defines a similar set of specifications for sheetfed printing. By 2005, both specifications are merged into a think tank called IDEAlliance with their own working groups. By 2006, both are unified under the framework of CGATS 21.

== History ==
Early work of specifying U.S. print color started in 1975 and resulted in a set of best practices, the precursor to SWOP. By the late 1980s, digitization of printing lead the SWOP committee to seek cooperation with CGATS, the ANSI Committee for Graphic Arts Technical Standards. The result was CGATS TR001, an ANSI technical report that specifies the colorimetric measurements of standard SWOP ink and media. In 2005, SWOP was merged into IDEAlliance.

GRACoL was founded in 1996 with the goal of specifying sheetfed printing in a similar way to SWOP. Annual specifications were published from 1997-2002. In 2006, SWOP and GRACol (coated CPRC6, uncoated CPRC3) was redefined in the G7 calibration method, which is also used in ISO/PAS 15339 or CGATS 21 defining the Characterized Reference Print Conditions (CPRCs). The standard defines SWOP as CPRC5, coated GRACol as CPRC6, and uncoated GRACol as CPRC3.

GRACoL-SWOP 2006 uses the ISO 12647-2:2004 paper. The 2013 revision uses a slightly bluer paper as the old paper is considered legacy by the authors. GRACoL/CPRC6 aligns mostly with ISO 12647-2 PC1, although the Tonal Value Increase (TVI) for "K" is slightly different due to G7 calibration.

== Scope ==
The SWOP specification covers many areas related to print production, complementing, extending and limiting those in other industry standards. The specification includes (but is not limited to) the following.

- A specification for the colors of the cyan, magenta, yellow and black ("key") inks used in CMYK printing. Inks conforming to the specification can be called SWOP inks. The specifications make reference to, but are not identical to, the ISO standard ISO 2846-1:2006.
- A specification for the colors of proofs produced by various technologies, so they are accurate representation of the SWOP inks eventually used to print. (See SWOP Certification Program below). Proofs made from systems that meet these specifications may be called SWOP Proofs.
- Specifications for expected dot gain (caused by ink dots enlarging over absorbent papers), also known as tonal value increase (TVI). G7-based versions use an alternative definition (see CGATS TR015).
- Requirements for producing halftones and color separation
- Design constraints, such as the minimum size of type which is to printed reversed or knocked out of a background, to keep legibility.
- Production constraints, such as a limit of 300% on the total mixture of inks (taking a mixture of 100% each of cyan, magenta, yellow and black as being 400%).

SWOP also endorse, produce or specify some other things.

- ICC profiles for color management, based on the standard called TR001, an ANSI technical report whose full title is “CGATS TR001-1995 Graphic Technology-Color Characterization Data for Type 1 Printing.” A number of profiles using TR001 are made with SWOP in the title, such as the profile USWebCoated (SWOP), which is widely available because it is included with many Adobe applications. TR001 profiles are not universal, because they were generated and tested with specific inks, papers, and printing technologies.
- The SWOP booklet gives the specifications mentioned above, often in reference to other industry specifications (ISO and other).
- A SWOP Certification Program for proofing (not press) printing systems. This is used by manufacturers, rather than purchasers, of systems.
