= Lumi River =

Lumi River may refer to:

- Lumi River (East Africa), river in Tanzania and Kenya
- Lumi River (Zambia), river in Zambia

== See also ==
- Lumi (disambiguation)
