= Lumia =

Lumia may refer to:

- Lumia (citrus), the pear lemon
- Lumia art, art created from light
- Guajona or Lumia, a creature of Cantabrian mythology
- Nokia Lumia, a line of smartphones by Nokia and Microsoft Mobile

== People ==
- Giuseppe Lumia (born 1960), Italian politician
- James Lumia, criminal, see Nicola Impastato
- Guy Lumia, concertmaster for the album Silver 'n Strings Play the Music of the Spheres

== See also ==
- Lumina (disambiguation)
- Lumea, former Romanian magazine
- Lumeah (disambiguation)
- Leumeah, a suburb of Sydney, Australia
