= Spot color =

Type of ink or pigment used in printing

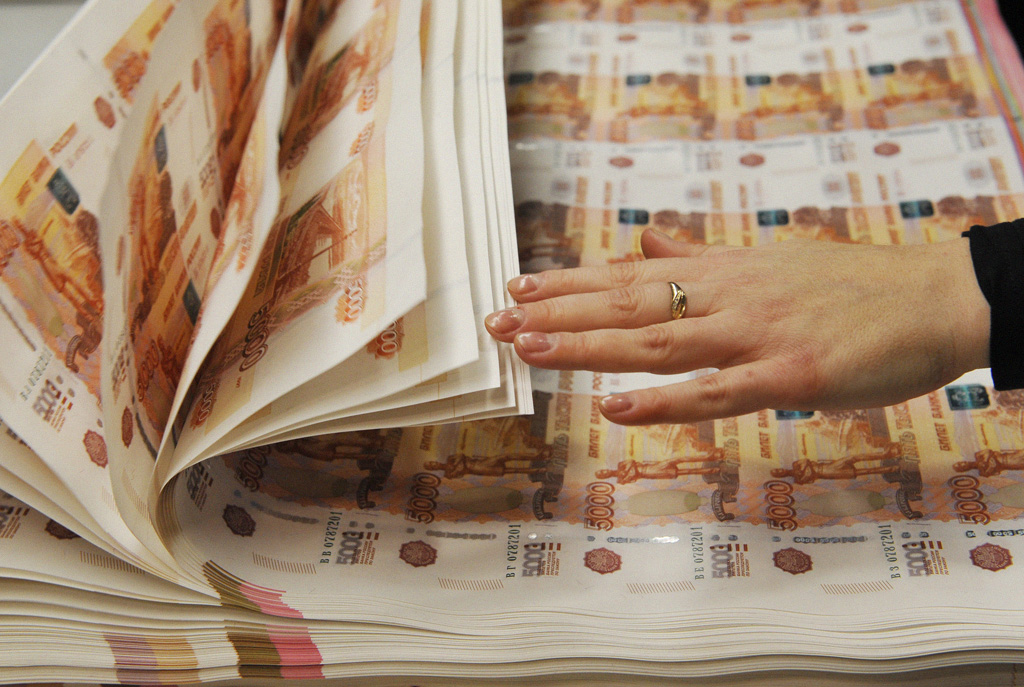
Printing Russian 5,000 ₽ banknotes with a metallic spot color

In offset printing, a spot color or solid color is any color generated by an ink (pure or mixed) that is printed using a single run, whereas a process color is produced by printing a series of dots of different colors.

The widespread offset-printing process is composed of the four spot colors cyan, magenta, yellow, and key (black) commonly referred to as CMYK. More advanced processes involve the use of six spot colors (hexachromatic process), which add orange and green to the process (termed CMYKOG). The two additional spot colors are added to compensate for the ineffective reproduction of faint tints using CMYK colors only. However, offset technicians around the world use the term spot color to mean any color generated by a non-standard offset ink; such as metallic, fluorescent, or custom hand-mixed inks.

When making a multi-color print with a spot color process, every spot color needs its own lithographic film. All the areas of the same spot color are printed using the same film, hence, using the same lithographic plate. The dot gain, hence the screen angle and line frequency, of a spot color vary according to its intended purpose. Spot lamination and UV coatings are sometimes referred to as 'spot colors', as they share the characteristics of requiring a separate lithographic film and print run.

== Computer methods ==
In print design, there are various methods to incorporate rather sophisticated patterns of spot colors in the final prepress artwork. Software applications such as Adobe InDesign, Adobe Illustrator, CorelDRAW, QuarkXPress and Scribus may generate spot colors as additional channels. Adobe Photoshop can also be used to generate soft edges (widely known as feathered edges) of spot colors. The dissolve effect provided by Adobe Photoshop layer patterns can be generated for any spot color.

== Optimizing usage ==
Generally the cost and potential for problems for a print job increase as one adds more spot colors, due to the increased cost and complexity of added process inks and films, and requiring more runs per finished print. However, because of the complicated process, spot colors are effective at preventing forgeries of money, passports, bonds and other important documents. Money printing for example, uses secret formulae of spot colors, some of which can be seen by the naked eye and some that can only be seen by using special lights or applying certain chemicals. Spot colors are frequently specified for brand identity (such as logos and marketing collateral) because the standardized inks can be matched consistently across different presses, print runs, and suppliers.

== Classification ==
Spot color classification has led to thousands of discrete colors being given unique names or numbers. There are several industry standards in the classification of spot color systems, such as:

- Pantone, the dominant spot color printing system in the United States and Europe.
- Toyo Ink, also known as the Toyo Color Finder System, is a spot color system common in Japan.
- DIC Color System Guide, another spot color system common in Japan – it is based on Munsell color theory.
- ANPA color palette, a palette of 300 colors specified by the American Newspaper Publishers Association for spot color usage in newspapers.
- GCMI, a standard for color used in package printing developed by the Glass Packaging Institute (formerly known as the Glass Container Manufacturers Institute, hence the abbreviation).
- HKS is a color system which contains 120 spot colors and 3,250 tones for coated and uncoated paper. HKS is an abbreviation of three German color manufacturers: Hostmann-Steinberg Druckfarben, Kast + Ehinger Druckfarben and H. Schmincke & Co.
- RAL is a color matching system used in Europe. The so-called RAL CLASSIC system is mainly used for varnish and powder coating.

Because each color system creates its own colors from scratch, spot colors from one system may be impossible to find within the library of another.
