= Hexachrome =

Six-color printing process designed by Pantone Inc

Hexachrome is a discontinued six-color printing process designed by Pantone. In addition to custom CMYK inks, Hexachrome uses orange and green inks to expand the color gamut for better color reproduction. It is therefore also known as a CMYKOG process.

Hexachrome was discontinued by Pantone in 2008 when Adobe Systems stopped supporting the HexWare plugin software. While the details of Hexachrome were not secret, its use was limited by trademark and patent to those obtaining a license from Pantone. The inventor of Hexachrome is Richard Herbert, who is also the president of Pantone Inc.

== Software ==
To use the Hexachrome process in a digital printing process, Pantone produced a plugin for Adobe Photoshop that allowed the designer to work in an RGB color space more typical of computer work. The plugin was called HexWare, which contained a set of Adobe plugins used by printers and designers who used the Hexachrome system. Older versions of QuarkXPress and Adobe InDesign also came with the Hexachrome system already installed and enabled.

== Purpose ==
The main purpose of Hexachrome was to create a printing ink system that could depict brighter and clearer pictures by being able to produce more accurate colors. Using this system instead of the CMYK ink system also allowed for printing more accurate skin tones and pastels. The Hexachrome system let users print images from computer screens that were not able to be accurately duplicated before. As well as producing more accurate color photo reproduction than previous systems, Hexachrome also increased efficiency as it was able to match many more Pantone spot colors. Designers would specify Pantone spot colors when designing logos, but many of the Pantone colors could not be produced using the CMYK color system, requiring additional passes on the press for each Pantone color, increasing printing costs. By using the Hexachrome system, a wider range of custom colors could be printed on the same pass as the color photo images.

== Users ==
Hexachrome was used by software companies including Aldus Corporation, Adobe Systems, and Quark and printer manufacturers including HP, Epson, and Xerox.

== See also ==
- CcMmYK color model
