= Burned (image) =

Color representation error in image processing

An image is said to be burned or burnt when its original gamut considerably exceeds the target gamut, or when the result of processing considerably exceeds the image's gamut, resulting in clipping. Colloquially, an image is burned when it contains uniform blobs of color, black, or white where there should be detail.

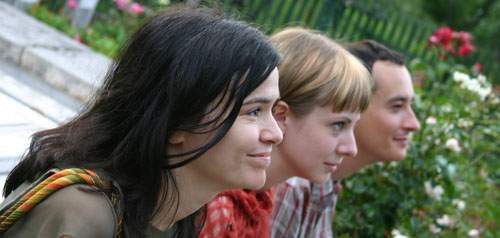
A sample photograph

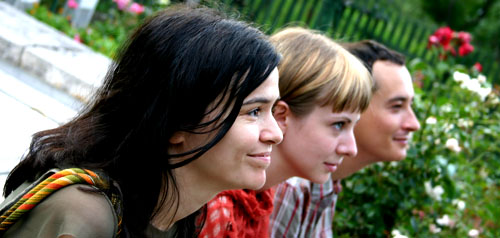
The same image burned by increasing the contrast

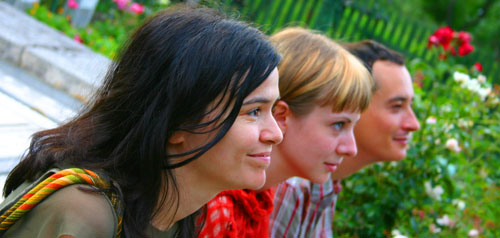
The original burned by increasing its saturation

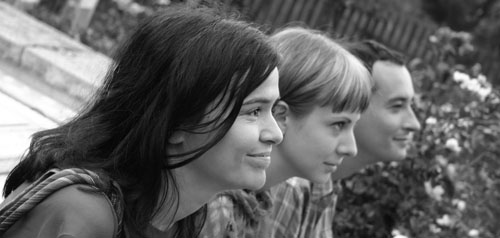
The original image in black and white

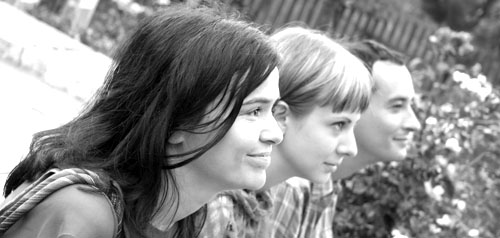
The black-and-white image burned for artistic purposes

All media for storing or capturing images, both analog and digital, are capable of storing only a limited number of color hues, and are bound to a certain gamut. Squeezing an image with a given gamut into a medium with a smaller gamut is done either by adapting the whole range of colors to the new gamut, or by trimming the colors out of gamut. Trimming colors at the extremes results in burning the image. While converting and capturing images is usually a "smart" process that tries to accommodate the entire gamut of the original into the target color space, extreme processing of an image usually results in burning, as defined above.

The most obvious case of burning is when an image's contrast is raised too much, and the result contains obvious black or white blobs, where there used to be detail in the shadows or the highlights. In this case, the brightness can be adjusted in parallel, and in this way, the artist decides whether to preserve detail in the shadows (increase brightness) or in the highlights (decrease brightness), at the expense of detail in the opposite.

A more subtle case of burning occurs when an image's saturation is increased too much. In this case, whichever color reaches its limits starts burning, and the resulting image contains blobs of that color where there used to be detail. In this case, avoiding the burn is much more difficult if the saturation needs to be increased to the respective level, because all other colors need to be adjusted proportionally, or discoloration will occur.

While burned images in color are typically not pleasing and need to be avoided, black-and-white photographs can sometimes be enhanced artistically by burning them; the decision to burn, along with the degree of burning, is a subjective matter.

Typically, as a rule of thumb, shadows are more "forgiving" with burning than highlights.

== See also ==
- Dodging and burning
