= Lumina =

Lumina may refer to:

== Arts, entertainment, and media ==
- Lumina, a literary journal published by Sarah Lawrence College
- World of Lumina or Lumina, a graphic novel by Emanuele Tenderini and Linda Cavallini
- "Lumina", a song by Joan Osborne from Relish
- "Lumina, the Sword of Luminescence", an elemental sword wielded by the titular protagonist, Brave Fencer Musashi
- Lumina (film), a 2024 science fiction horror film.

== Automobiles ==
- Chevrolet Lumina, a 1989–2001 American mid-size car
- Chevrolet Lumina APV, a 1990–1996 American minivan
- Holden Commodore, a 1978–2020 Australian mid-size car, sold in various markets as the Chevrolet Lumina from 1998 to 2011

== Businesses and organizations ==
- Lumina Foundation, an American grant-making foundation
- Lumina Media, a former American publisher

== Places ==
- Lumina, Constanța, Romania, a commune
- LUMINA, a residential development in San Francisco

== Other uses ==
- Lumina (desktop environment), for TrueOS and other Unix and Unix-like systems
- Lumina (typeface), a foundry type made by Ludwig & Mayer
- Lumina, the plural form for Lumen (anatomy), the innermost layer of a hollow organ such as the stomach or an artery
