= World of Lumina =

Graphic novel by Emanuele Tenderini and Linda Cavallini

- World of Lůmina
- Lumina Volume 1 Cover.
- Genre: Science fiction, Fantasy
- Manga
- Written by: Emanuele Tenderini and Linda Cavallini
- Published by: Tatai Lab
- Original run: April 29, 2015 – present

World of Lůmina is a bright, colorful Italian graphic novel by Emanuele Tenderini and Linda Cavallini, authors of many titles previously published by names such as Sergio Bonelli, Delcourt, Ankama, Mondadori, Hachette, Les Humanoïdes Associés, Gormiti, DeAgostini, Panini. This is one of the first comic books in the world to be coloured with the hyperflat technique, and printed using hexachrome, a six-color printing process.

Two earth-bound children, brother and sister, Kite and Miriam have been chosen to become carriers of the Fej Farok, a powerful parasite capable of traveling through parallel universes.

One day they are captured by strange Black Creatures and their destinies part ways. Now Kite, who is the younger of the two, must undertake a dangerous journey in search of his sister through a new and hostile world, a dazzling planet that its inhabitants call Lumina.

Lumina is a project midway between Sci-FI and Fantasy. The project tells the story of the journey and growing up of Kite and Miriam through an imaginative evolution of amazing environments. Fraternal love, ecology and respect for all living things are the backbone themes of this story.

== Plot ==
The planet, Fej Farok, brother and sister Miriam and Kite.

The Fej Farok is a parasite and a deity, which can cross the membrane that separates the parallel universes, adjusting their balance if needed. It's a creature made up of two parts – Fej and Farok – and each of them is hosted by two bodies, two porters, elected among the descendants of the Abyssals, very intelligent and ancient creatures that form the spiritual and religious side of Lumina. When the Fej Farok picks two individuals, the chosen ones, it literally owns their bodies and gives them unimaginable power. They become Fej (Yin), and Farok (Yang).

The dawn of time and Fej Farok ruled the planet Lumina.

However, the ambition and the thirst for conquest of Fej were great: he wished to conquer all the planets in the Universe, in all possible realities, using their immense powers. To achieve his goal, he needed his half Farok, which, however, did not share the destructive plans and conquerors of the counterparty.

Fej so he decided to kill Farok. A few moments before being struck by the sword of Fej, Farok could be projected on a planet, of all possible worlds, in a time among all possible times. In just a few seconds to choose two innocent creatures and give them his share of the parasite and its powers. On that planet, the Earth, in the present, Fej would not be able to find the completion of his power to achieve his evil purposes.

Earth, today:

Miriam and Kite are two lively kids, as many of their age, dividing their time between school and friends. They are orphans. Miriam looks after her little brother, who is not really the easy kind, though. Miriam is a very nice young girl and careful sister but at times she can be a little bit too much harsh with herself and the people around her. Kite is a real force of nature, lazy at school and on the everyday tasks and a real daredevil on the streets while practicing his favorite hobby, the Parkour: he is a young, flamboyant energy mix.

For some time now, the two have been sharing a strange hallucination: they were both still, hand in hand, in a kind of a mesmerized state, staring at a strange geometric flame containing an immense, very brightly lit opening in its very center. Kite and Miriam have never given too much weight to these visions, till one day, at school, they got suddenly surrounded by very menacing mysterious Black Creatures. Frightened to the bones, they tried to run away, but they soon found themselves in the strange place they had seen in their common visions.

They got pushed inside the flame and from that moment on their life would have never been the same.

When they wake up, Miriam and Kite are right in the midst of a bloody battle between the Black Creatures and a powerful warrior. Above their heads a giant sprawling body materializes and grows exponentially, destroying everything around him. Behind them, a strange man in a hood speaking an incomprehensible strange language, is repeating a magical chant that sounds like an ancient rite.

In no time, the two kids got parted. As is Miriam taken by a Black Creature, Kite stays on the scene, firmly clinging to the strong arm of the warrior. The gigantic creature has disappeared. Now Kite is alone, confused but very determined to find his sister. He will face a long and tough journey, along with and fighting against extraordinary creatures. His goal is to find Miriam and get out of that vast and dazzling planet Lumina, as the fearsome warrior Oleg and the abysmal Nohe call it.

== Volume list ==
No.	Original release date	Original ISBN	English release date	English ISBN
1	April 29, 2015	978-88-940812-2-0	April 29, 2015	978-88-940812-2-0
