= Emanuele Tenderini =

Italian comic book artist

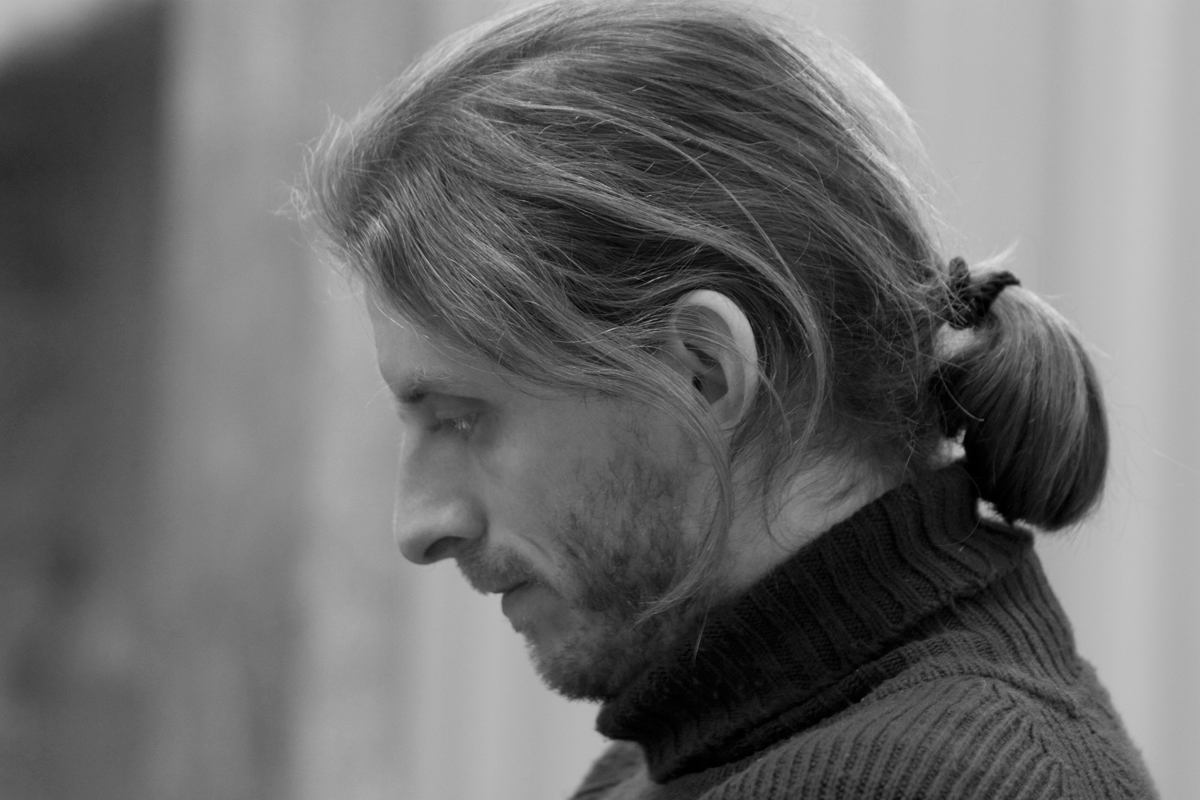
- Emanuele Tenderini at 2008 Venice Comic Art Fest
- Born: Emanuele Tenderini; June 30, 1977 (age 49) Venice, Italy
- Area: Colourist
- Notable works: Wondercity, Dampyr, Dylan Dog
- Awards: Ayaaak Award, 2009

Emanuele Tenderini (born 30 June 1977 in Venice) is an Italian comic book artist known for his participation in Wondercity. He has collaborated with many other comic book series in Italy and abroad.

== Biography ==
Tenderini attended the Istituto Commerciale Paolo Sarpi and graduated as accountant. He then worked as graphic designer before moving to Milan where he graduated with honors at the Scuola del Fumetto. He moved back to Venice working as colourist with the thrash metal band Merendine.

In 2004, with Alex Crippa, he released the comic book 100 Anime (ed. Delcourt). In 2005, he released Othon & Laiton and Wondercity. Between 2006 and 2007, he drew two volumes of Oeil de Jade (ed. Les Humanoïdes Associés). He then collaborated to Prediction (2007-2008), Arcane Majeur, Wisher, La Porte d'Ishtar (2008), Dei and 1066 (2011).

In Italy, he drew the special editions of Dylan Dog in 2007 and of Dampyr in 2008. Other Italian collaborations were Vasco Comics (2007), Rumbler (2008) and The Odissey (2011).

In 2014, with Linda Cavallini, he released World of Lumina, a graphic novel developed through their own digital color technic, named Hyperflat, and produced by a crowdfunding on Indiegogo in the same year.

== Works ==
- 100 anime - vol 1, 2, 3, Ed. Delcourt - Ed BD, 2004-2007.
- Othon & Laiton - vol 1, 2, Ed. Paquet, 2005.
- Wondercity - vol 0, 1, 2, 3, 4, 5, 6, Ed. Soleil - Ed Freebooks, 2005.
- Oeil de Jade - vol 1, 2, Ed. Les Humanoïdes Associés - Eura, 2006-2007.
- Gormiti, Ed. Giochi Preziosi, 2006-2011.
- Vasco Comics, - vol 1, 3, 4, Ed. Panini, 2007.
- Dylan Dog, nr 250, Ed. Sergio Bonelli, 2007.
- Dylan Dog Color Fest, - vol 1, 2, Ed. Sergio Bonelli, 2007-2008.
- Prediction, - vol 1, 2, Ed. Delcourt, 2007-2008.
- Arcane Majeur, - vol 5, Ed. Delcourt, 2008.
- Wisher, - vol 1, Ed. LeLombard, 2008.
- Rumbler, Ed. De Agostini, 2008.
- Dampyr, nr 100, Ed. Sergio Bonelli, 2008.
- The Odissey, Ed. Sperling&Kupfer, 2010.
- Dei, Ed. Ankama, 2011.
- 1066, Ed. Le Lombard - Comma 22, 2011.
- World of Lumina, vol 1, Ed. Tatai Lab, 2015.

== Awards ==
- 2009 - Ayaaak Award as outstanding colorist of 2008, for Dylan Dog Color Fest vol 2 and Dampyr n 100.
