= Al-Lumi =

- Village
- Location in Yemen
- Coordinates: 15.837°N 43.89894°E
- Country: Yemen
- Governorate: 'Amran
- District: Jabal Iyal Yazid
- Elevation: 8,458 ft (2,578 m)
- Time zone: UTC+3 (Yemen Standard Time)

Al-Lumi (Arabic: اللومي, romanized: al-Lūmī) is a small village in Jabal Iyal Yazid District of 'Amran Governorate, Yemen. It is located on the slopes of Jabal Iyal Yazid, 3km north-northeast of Da‘‘an.

== History ==
The earliest known mention of al-Lumi in historical sources is in 1068 (460 AH). Historical sources mentioning it include the Ghayat al-amani of Yahya ibn al-Husayn, the Kitab al-Simt of Muhammad ibn Hatim al-Yami al-Hamdani, and the al-Sulayhiyyun of Husayn al-Hamdani.
