= CcMmYK color model =

Six-color printing process

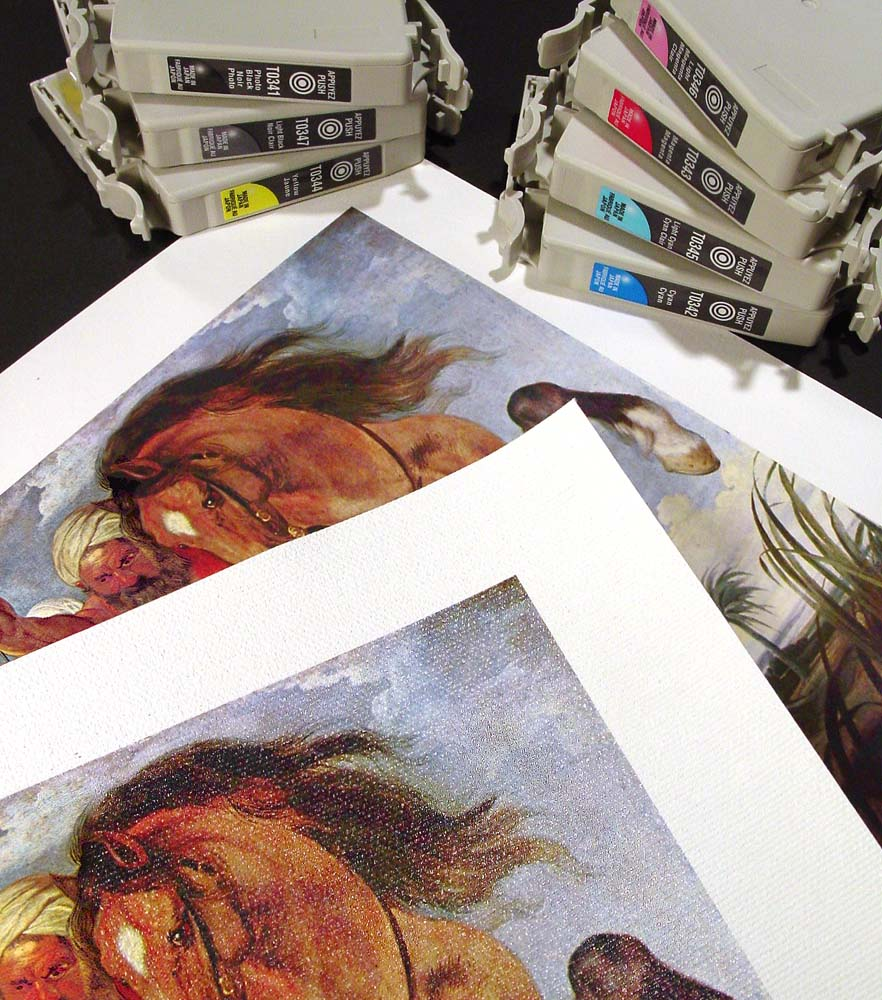
An image printed with a CcMmYKk ink set, on both paper and canvas stock. The ink cartridges used are also shown.

CcMmYK, sometimes referred to as CMYKLcLm or CMYKcm, is a six-color printing process used in some inkjet printers optimized for photo printing. It complements the more common four-color CMYK process, which uses only cyan, magenta, yellow and black, by adding light cyan and light magenta. Individually, light cyan is often abbreviated Lc or c, and light magenta Lm or m.

== Advantages of CcMmYK over CMYK ==
CcMmYK colorants reduce graininess in the middle tone region. This reduced graininess typically improves the photographic appearance of blue skies and some flesh tones.

The most noticeable result of using light cyan and light magenta inks is the removal of a distinct and harsh dither dot appearance in prints that use light shades of cyan or magenta produced with only the CMYK inks. Usually when printing a dark color the printer will saturate an area with colored ink dots, and conversely, for a light color it will use fewer ink dots. The resulting graininess is hard to notice with yellow because yellow is perceived as a very light color, but sparse individual cyan and magenta ink dots, e.g. for a pale blue sky, can be discernible against a white background.

By using light cyan and light magenta, the printer can saturate areas that would typically use halftoning with these inks to remove the look of sparse magenta and cyan dots. The disadvantage is that the printer needs approximately twice as much light cyan and magenta ink to achieve the same saturation as it would using pure cyan and magenta inks. The result, however, is significantly better for some images.
