= Color triangle =

Arrangement of colors within a triangle

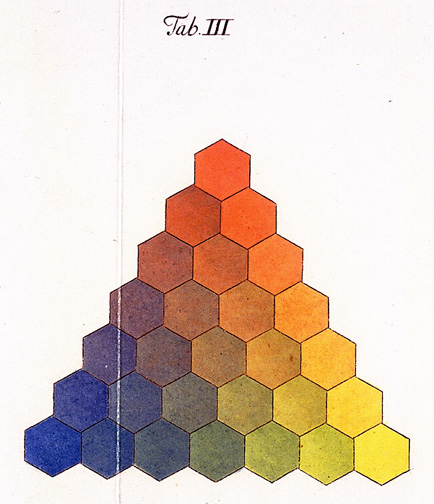
A 1775 color triangle by Tobias Mayer.

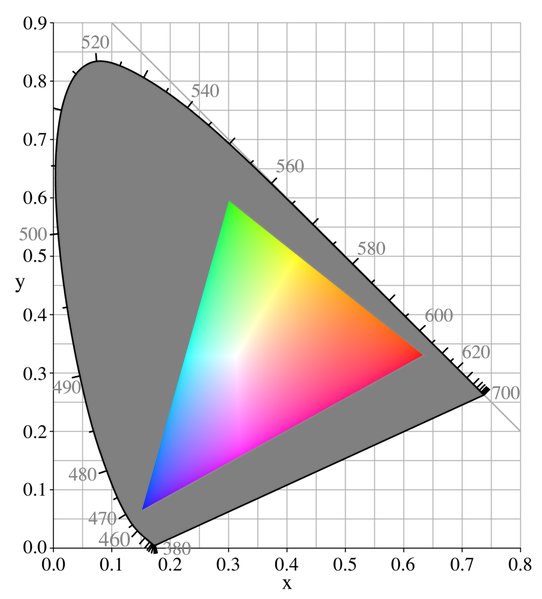
The sRGB color triangle, shown as a subset of x, y space, a chromaticity space based on CIE 1931 colorimetry

A color triangle is an arrangement of colors within a triangle, based on the additive or subtractive combination of three primary colors at its corners.

An additive color space defined by three primary colors has a chromaticity gamut that is a color triangle, when the amounts of the primaries are constrained to be nonnegative.

Before the theory of additive color was proposed by Thomas Young and further developed by James Clerk Maxwell and Hermann von Helmholtz, triangles were also used to organize colors, for example around a system of red, yellow, and blue primary colors.

After the development of the CIE system, color triangles were used as chromaticity diagrams, including briefly with the trilinear coordinates representing the chromaticity values. Since the sum of the three chromaticity values has a fixed value, it suffices to depict only two of the three values, using Cartesian co-ordinates. In the modern x, y diagram, the large triangle bounded by the imaginary primaries X, Y, and Z has corners (1, 0), (0, 1), and (0, 0), respectively; color triangles with real primaries are often shown within this space.

If the colors of the chromaticity diagram are inverted, a triangle with real primary colors cyan, magenta, and yellow at its corners, and black at its center, can be outlined within it, representing a modern understanding of subtractive color mixing that is useful for dye- or pigment-based media such as paint or ink. Secondaries red, blue, and green then lie along the sides of the triangle, representing mixtures made from the colors at adjacent corners. The black center represents the darkening that occurs when all three primaries, or any two complementary colors, are mixed.

== Maxwell's disc ==
Maxwell was intrigued by James David Forbes's use of color tops. By rapidly spinning the top, Forbes created the illusion of a single color that was a mixture of the primaries:

[The] experiments of Professor J. D. Forbes, which I witnessed in 1849… [established] that blue and yellow do not make green, but a pinkish tint, when neither prevails in the combination…[and the] result of mixing yellow and blue was, I believe, not previously known.

— James Clerk Maxwell, Experiments on colour, as perceived by the eye, with remarks on colour-blindness (1855), Transactions of the Royal Society of Edinburgh

Maxwell took this a step further by using a circular scale around the rim with which to measure the ratios of the primaries, choosing vermilion (V), emerald (EG), and ultramarine (U).

Initially, he compared the color he observed on the spinning top with a paper of different color, in order to find a match. Later, he mounted a pair of papers, snow white (SW) and ivory black (Bk), in an inner circle, thereby creating shades of gray. By adjusting the ratio of primaries, he matched the observed gray of the inner wheel, for example:

$0.37V+0.27U+0.36EG=0.28SW+0.72BK$

To determine the chromaticity of an arbitrary color, he replaced one of the primaries with a sample of the test color and adjusted the ratios until he found a match. For pale chrome (PC) he found $0.33PC+0.55U+0.12EG=0.37SW+0.63BK$. Next, he rearranged the equation to express the test color (PC, in this example) in terms of the primaries.

This would be the precursor to the color matching functions of the CIE 1931 color space, whose chromaticity diagram is shown above.

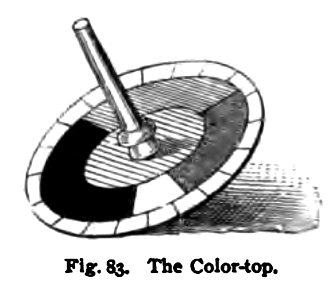
Drawing of Maxwell's color top

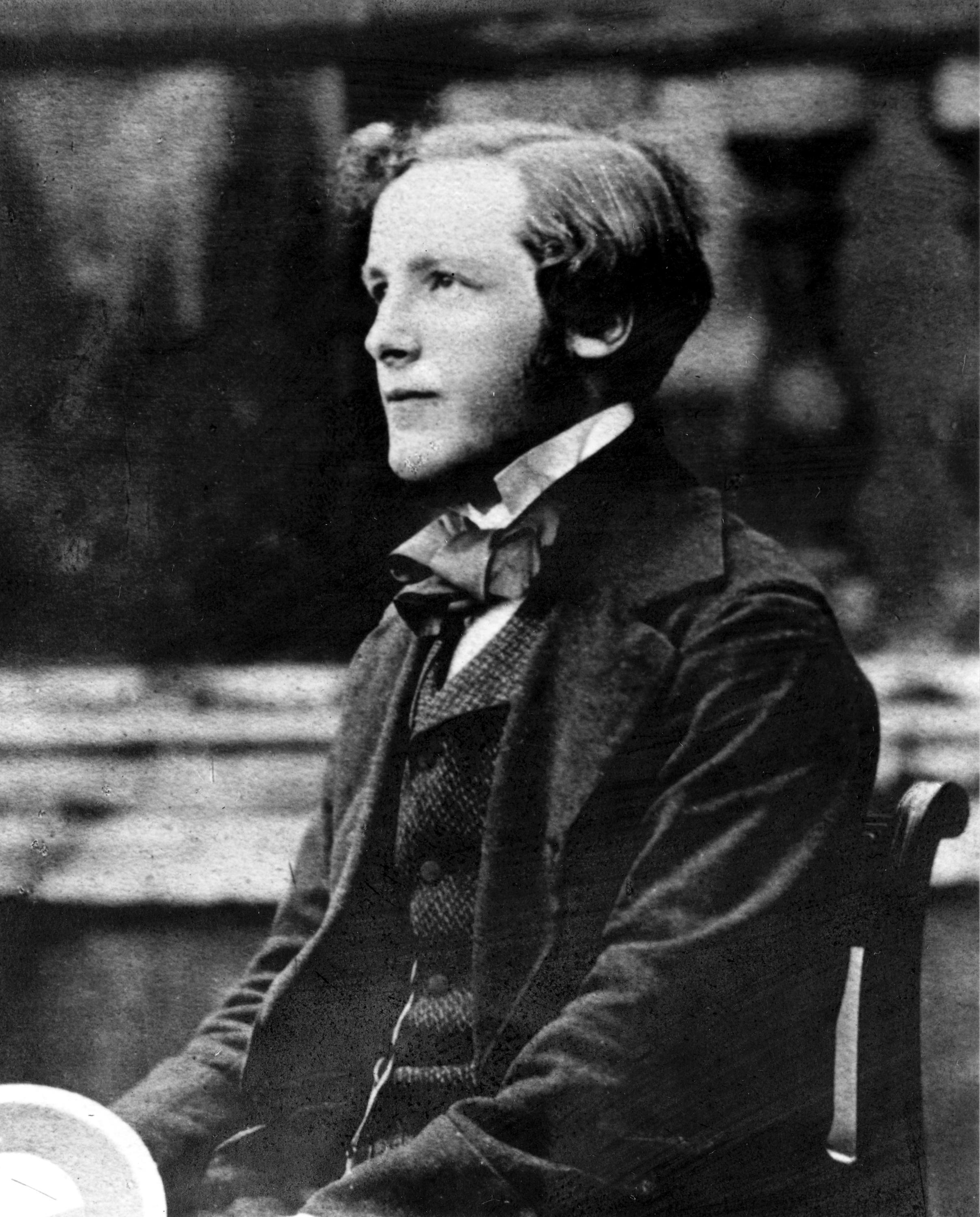
Maxwell with his wheel

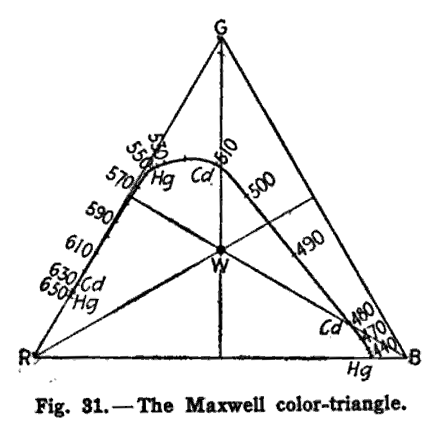
Maxwell's color triangle

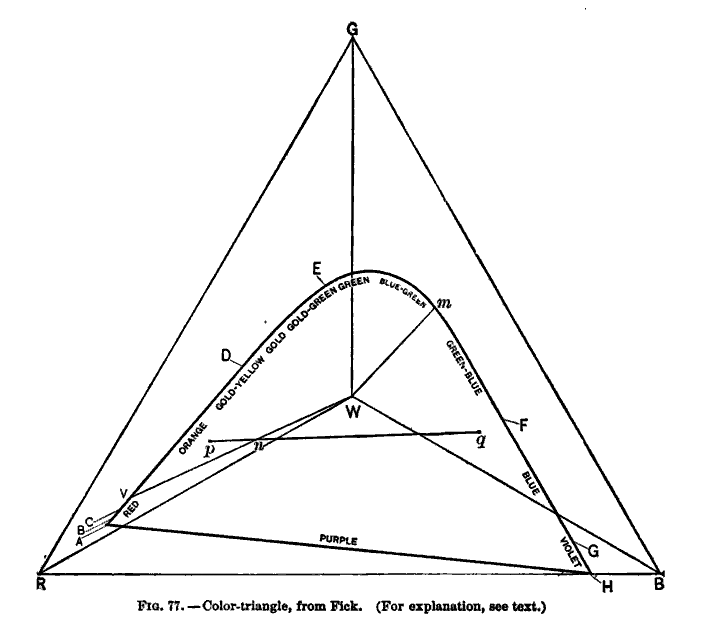
A color triangle attributed to Fick in 1892, based on imaginary primaries corresponding to the three primary sensations of the human eye. In such a triangle, all real colors fall within the curved outline defined by the "pure sensations".

== See also ==
- Color wheel
