= Lumeah =

Lumeah may refer to:

- Lumeah, Queensland, a locality in the Blackall-Tambo Region, Australia
- Lumeah, Western Australia, a town in the Great Southern region

== See also ==
- Leumeah, a suburb of Sydney, Australia
