= Lumi (software) =

lumi software
- Stable release: 2.0 / March 4, 2007
- Operating system: Linux, UNIX, Mac OS X, Windows
- Platform: R programming language and Bioconductor
- Type: Analysis of Illumina microarrays
- License: GNU General Public License
- Website: lumi software release website

lumi is a free, open source and open development software project for the analysis and comprehension of Illumina expression and methylation microarray data. The project was started in the summer of 2006 and set out to provide algorithms and data management tools of Illumina in the framework of Bioconductor. It is based on the statistical R programming language.

== Features ==
The lumi package provides an analysis pipeline for probe-level Illumina expression and methylation microarray data, including probe-identifier management (nuID), updated probe-to-gene mapping and annotation using the latest release of RefSeq (nuIDblast), probe-intensity transformation (VST) and normalization (RSN), quality control (QA/QC) and preprocessing methods specific for Illumina methylation data. By extending the ExprSet object with Illumina-specific features, lumi is designed to work with other Bioconductor packages, such as Limma and GOstats to detect differential genes and conduct Gene Ontology analysis.

== History ==
The lumi project was started in the summer of 2006 at the Bioinformatics Core Facility of the Robert H. Lurie Comprehensive Cancer Center, Northwestern University. Originally lumi was designed for the analysis of Illumina Expression BeadArray data. Starting from 2010 (version > 2.0), functions of analyzing Illumina methylation microarray data was added. The project team consists of Drs. Pan Du, Simon M. Lin, and Warren A. Kibbe. The project was started upon a request for collaboration from Dr. Serdar E. Bulun to analyze a set of new Illumina microarray data acquired at his lab on the study of the effect of retinoic acids on cancers. Dr. Pan Du led the software development of the project. lumi was the first software package to utilize the unique design of redundancy of beadArrays for the data transformation and normalization processes. The first release of lumi was on January 3, 2007 through the Bioconductor website. Before its formal release, it was beta-tested at Norwegian Radiumhospital, Leiden University Medical Center, Universiteit van Amsterdam, Università degli Studi di Brescia, UC Davis, Wayne State University, NIH, M.D. Anderson Cancer Center, Case Western Reserve University, Harvard University, Washington University, and Walter and Eliza Hall Institute of Medical Research.

== See also ==
- Bioconductor, integrated software for the statistical analysis of wet lab data in molecular biology
- Illumina Inc. and its beadArray technology
