= CMYK color model =

Subtractive color model used in printing

Ink used in four-color printing: cyan, magenta, yellow, and black.

Pairwise combinations of cyan, magenta, and yellow inks produce red, green, and blue. All three combined produce an imperfect black.

The CMYK color model is a subtractive color model used in color printing as well as describing the printing process. The abbreviation CMYK refers to the four color components used in printing: cyan, magenta, yellow, and black (the key plate).

In subtractive models, inks reduce the amount of light reflected from a white or light background. White is the color of the substrate, and black results from the combination of inks. This contrasts with additive color models (e.g., RGB color model), where colors are produced by emitting light, white results from combining all primary colors, and black represents the absence of light. The addition of black ink reduces ink consumption and produces more consistent dark tones compared to using cyan, magenta, and yellow alone.

The CMYK printing process was first implemented in the 1890s for color newspaper illustrations and comic strips.

== Halftoning ==
Diagram showing color halftoning with CMYK separations. The combined halftone pattern appears as a uniform color to the human eye at sufficient viewing distance.

Halftoning (or screening) allows a printer to produce continuous tones by varying the size and spacing of small ink dots. This creates the perception of intermediate colors between the primary inks. For example, 20% coverage of magenta ink produces a pink tone rather than full magenta.

Without halftoning, CMYK inks would only produce eight colors: the three primaries (cyan, magenta, yellow), the three secondaries (red, green, blue), white, and black.

== Comparison to CMY ==
CMYK is an extension of the CMY model, which omits black ink. Black ink is added in four-color printing for several practical reasons:

- The "key" (K) plate provides outlines and text with higher precision than using three inks alone.
- Using black ink reduces ink consumption and drying time, preventing paper distortion or tearing.
- Combining 100% cyan, magenta, and yellow produces a dark but imperfect black; black ink produces more consistent dark tones.
- Black ink is more cost-effective than combining three colored inks.

A dark area printed with CMY and then overlaid with black is referred to as rich black.

Techniques such as under color removal, under color addition, and gray component replacement determine the amount of black ink relative to other inks.

== Other printer color models ==
CMYK contrasts with spot color printing, where specific inks produce fixed colors. Some presses can combine process and spot colors. High-quality printed materials often require full-color process printing, sometimes augmented with spot colors or metallic inks.

Extended gamut systems (e.g., CMYKOG Hexachrome) increase the range of reproducible colors beyond standard CMYK.

== Comparison with RGB displays ==
Comparison of RGB and CMYK gamuts on the CIE 1931 xy chromaticity diagram

RGB displays emit light and produce additive colors, while CMYK inks absorb light and produce subtractive colors. Each model has a distinct color gamut; colors visible on one may not be reproducible on the other.

== Conversion ==
RGB and CMYK are device-dependent; no universal formula converts between them. Color management systems using ICC profiles are required to map between devices accurately. Conversion depends on device gamuts, rendering intents, and factors such as dot gain and Neugebauer primaries.

Predefined printing standards, such as Specifications for Web Offset Publications, include ICC profiles for software and operating systems.

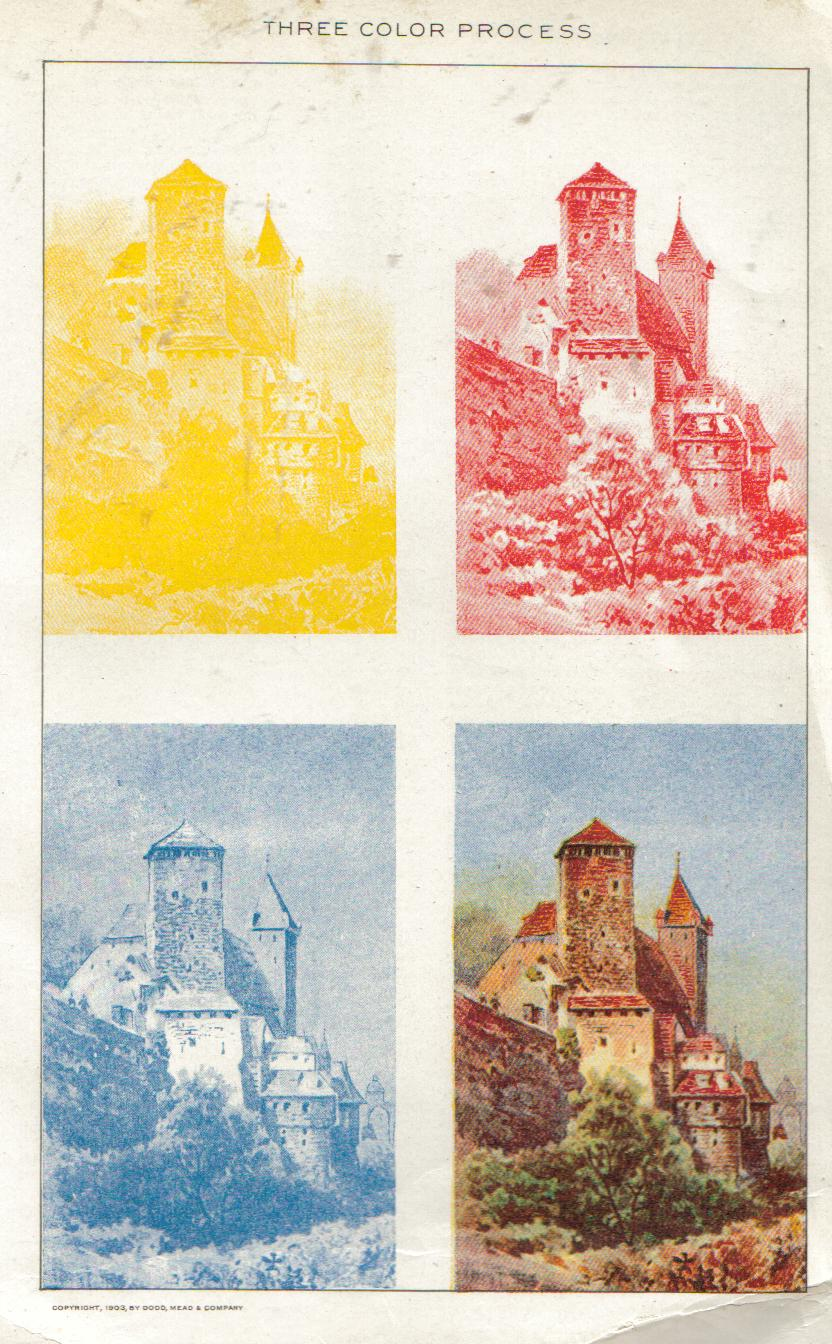
Early three-color process (1902)

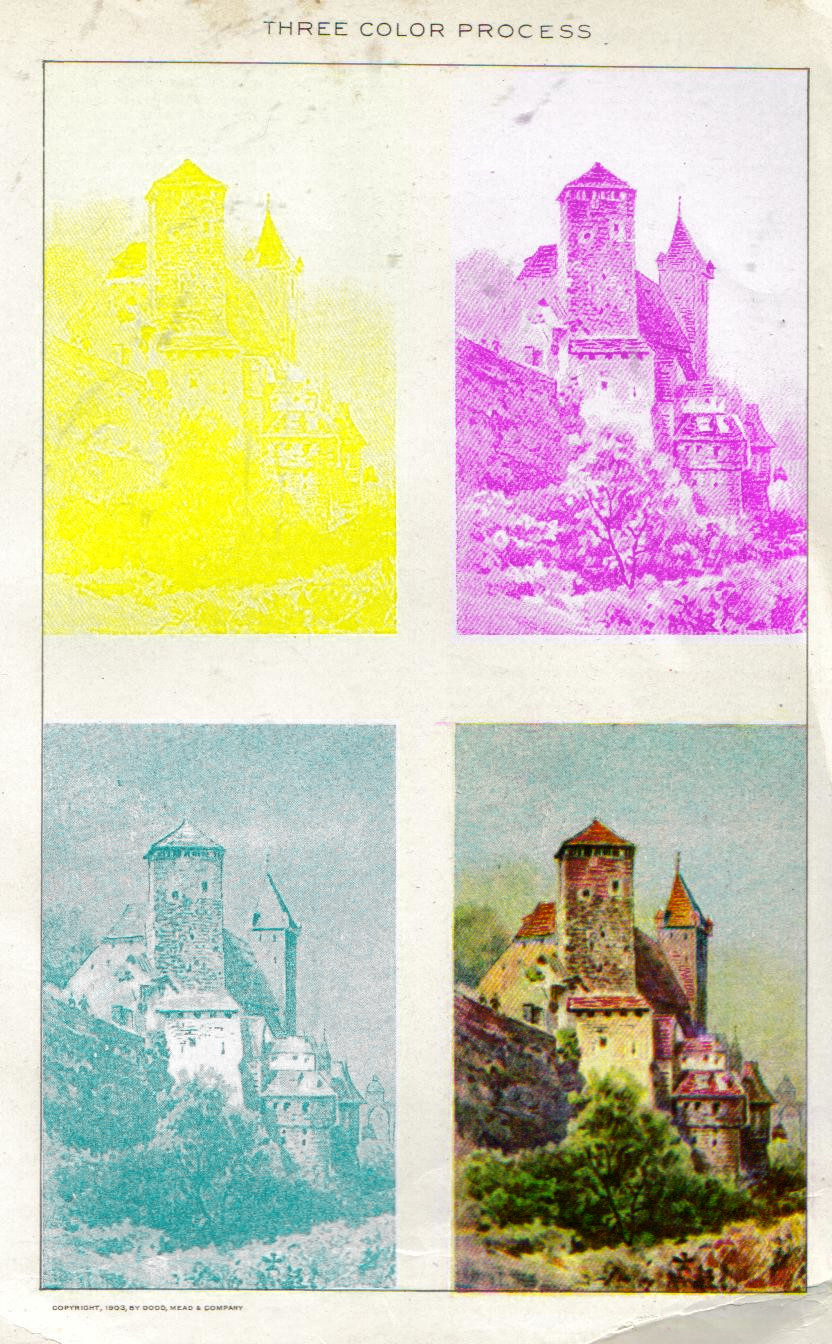
Approximation using CMY colors

== See also ==
- CcMmYK color model
- Cycolor
- RGB color model
- Gray component replacement
- Jacob Christoph Le Blon
- Specifications for Web Offset Publications
- Color management
- Technicolor
