= Lumi River (Zambia) =

River in Zambia

The River Lumi (Kawimbe River) is located in east Zambia.Its source is at Kawimbe Mission near the United Church of Zambia.The river doesn't dry up in the dry season despite being considerably small, but the water level difference between wet season and dry season is big. The River Saisi-Lumi confluence occurs east of Mbala, Zambia.
