= Cyan =

Color between blue and green

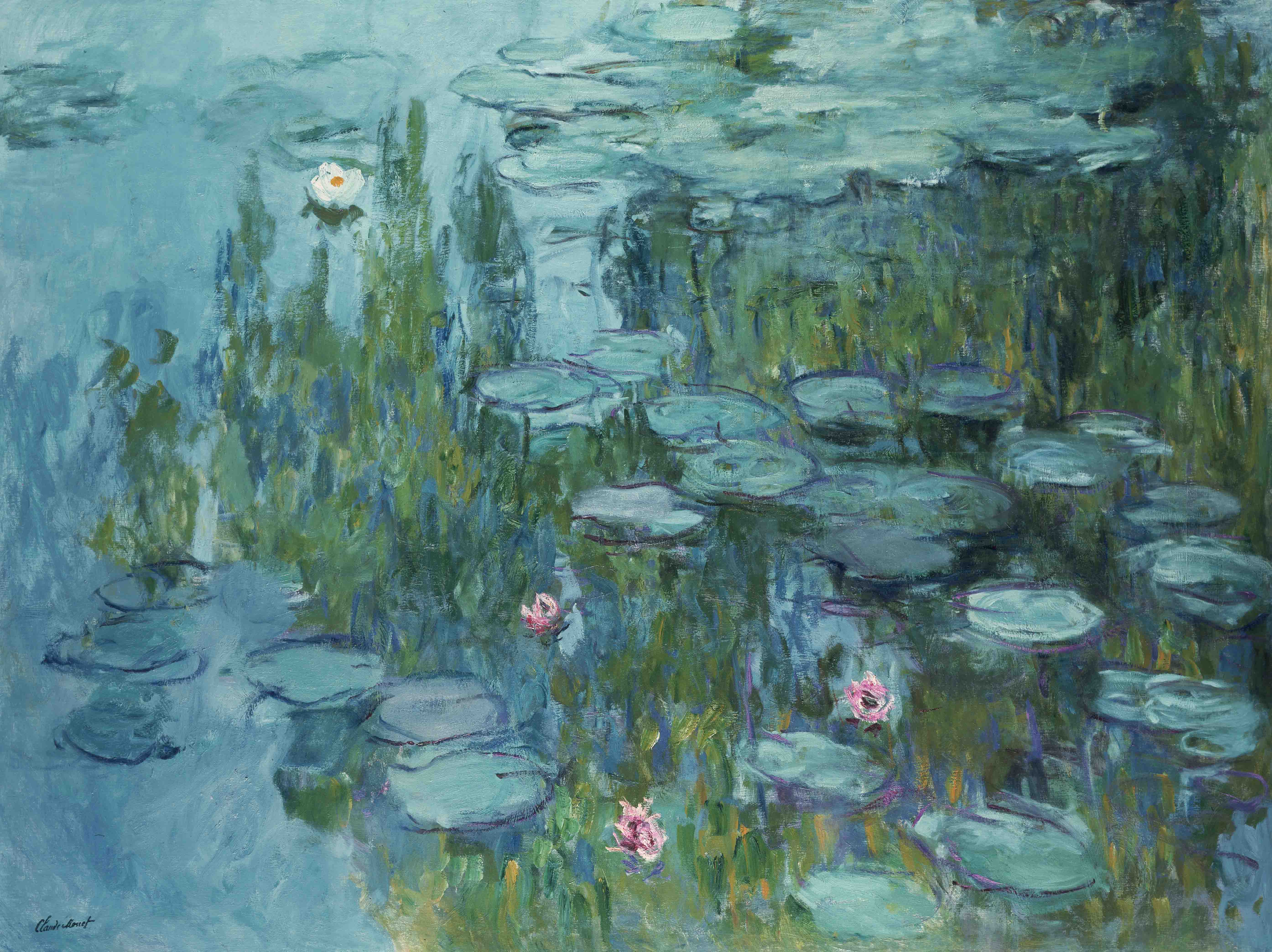
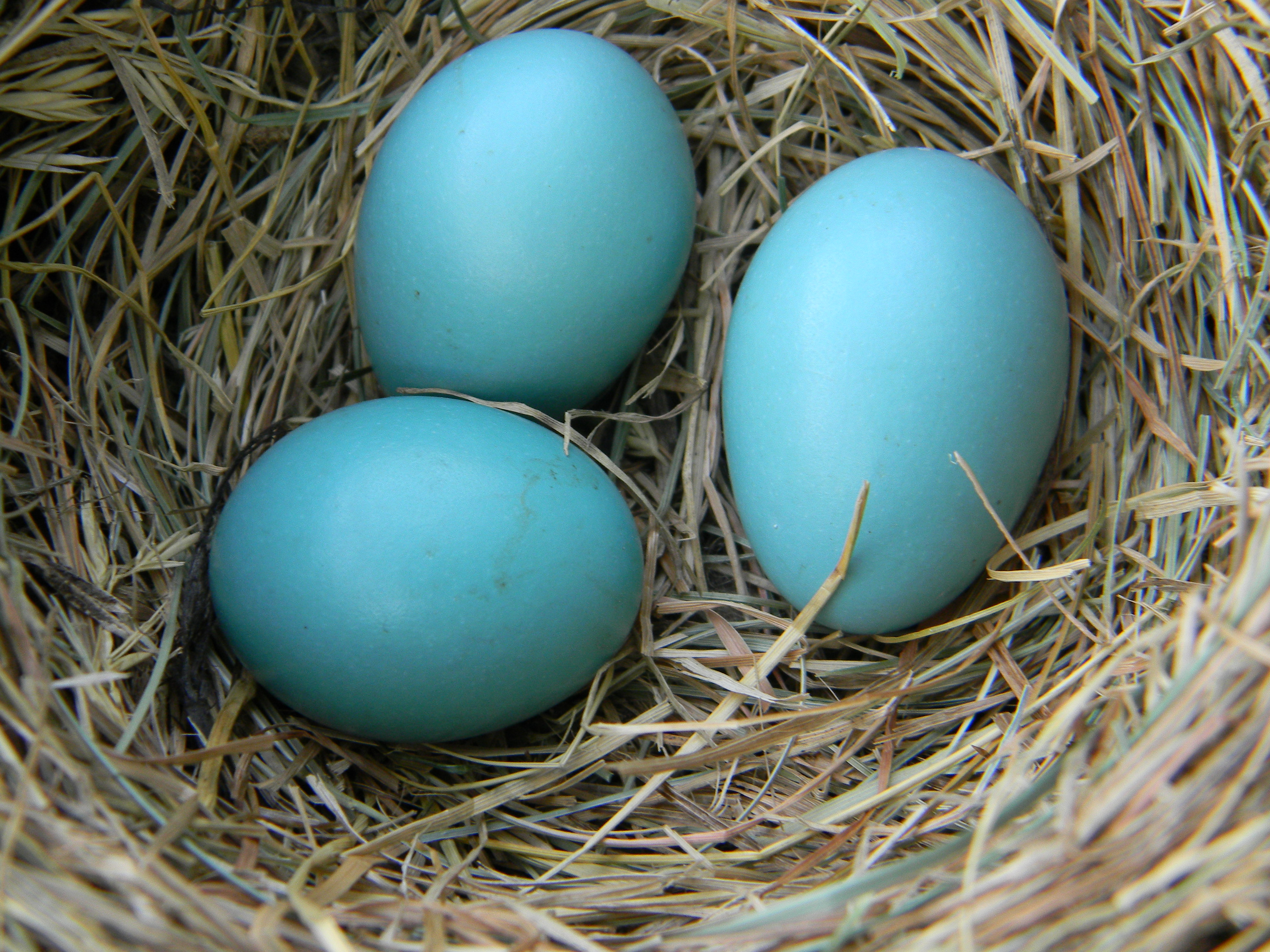
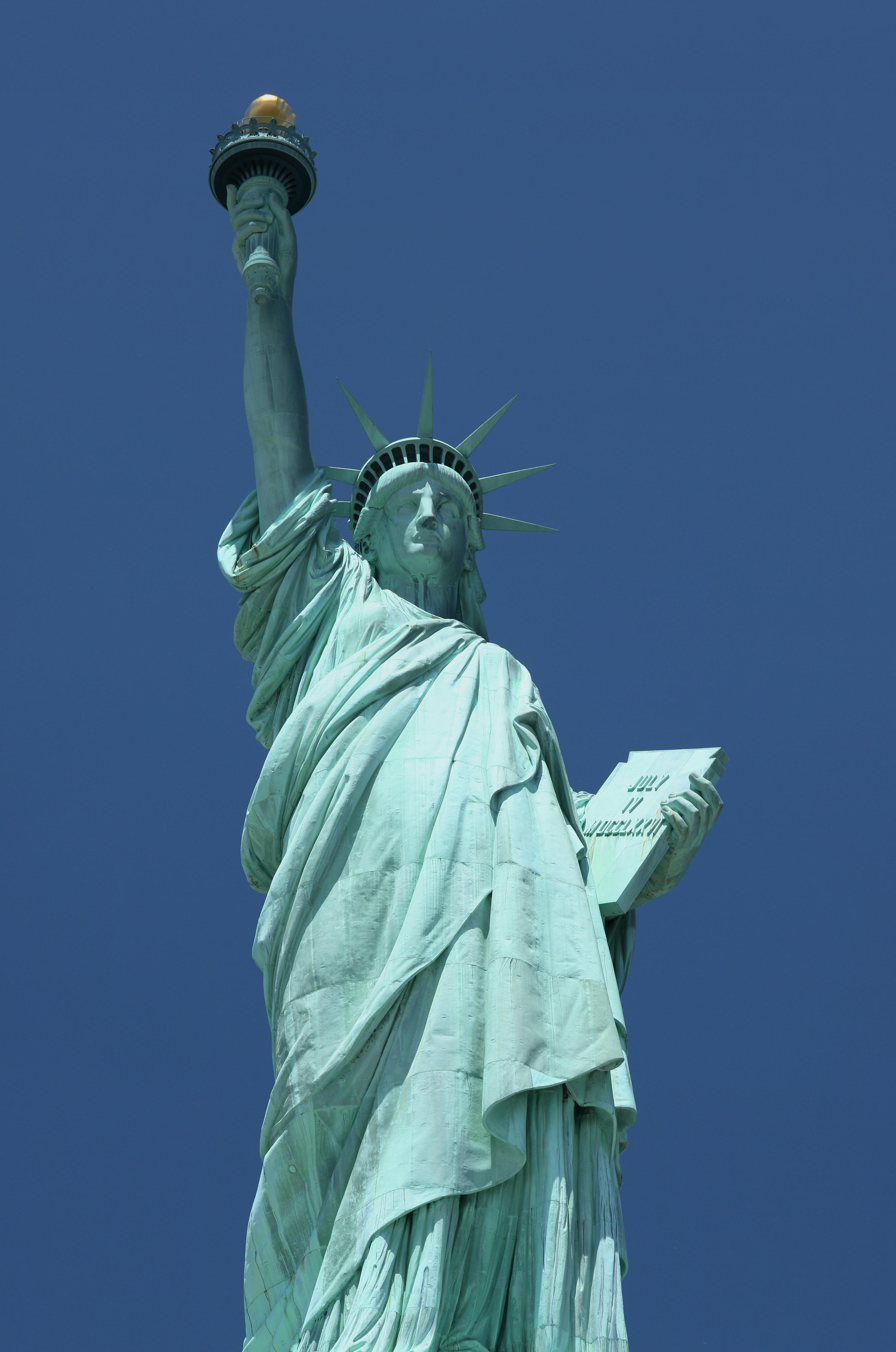
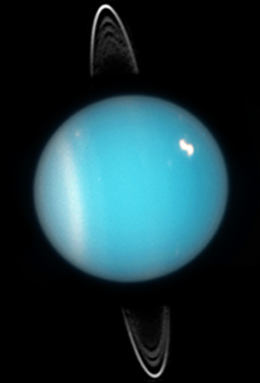
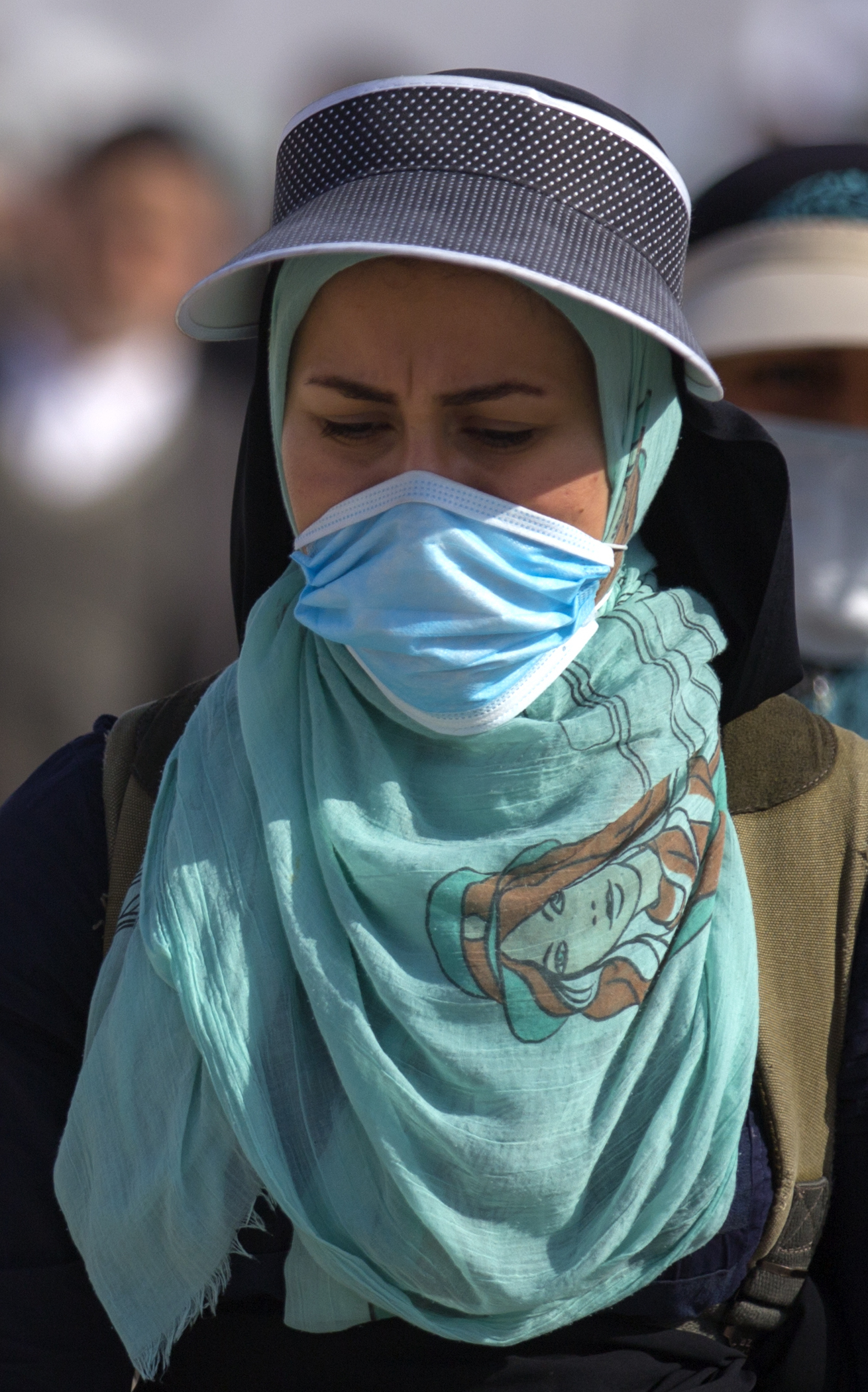
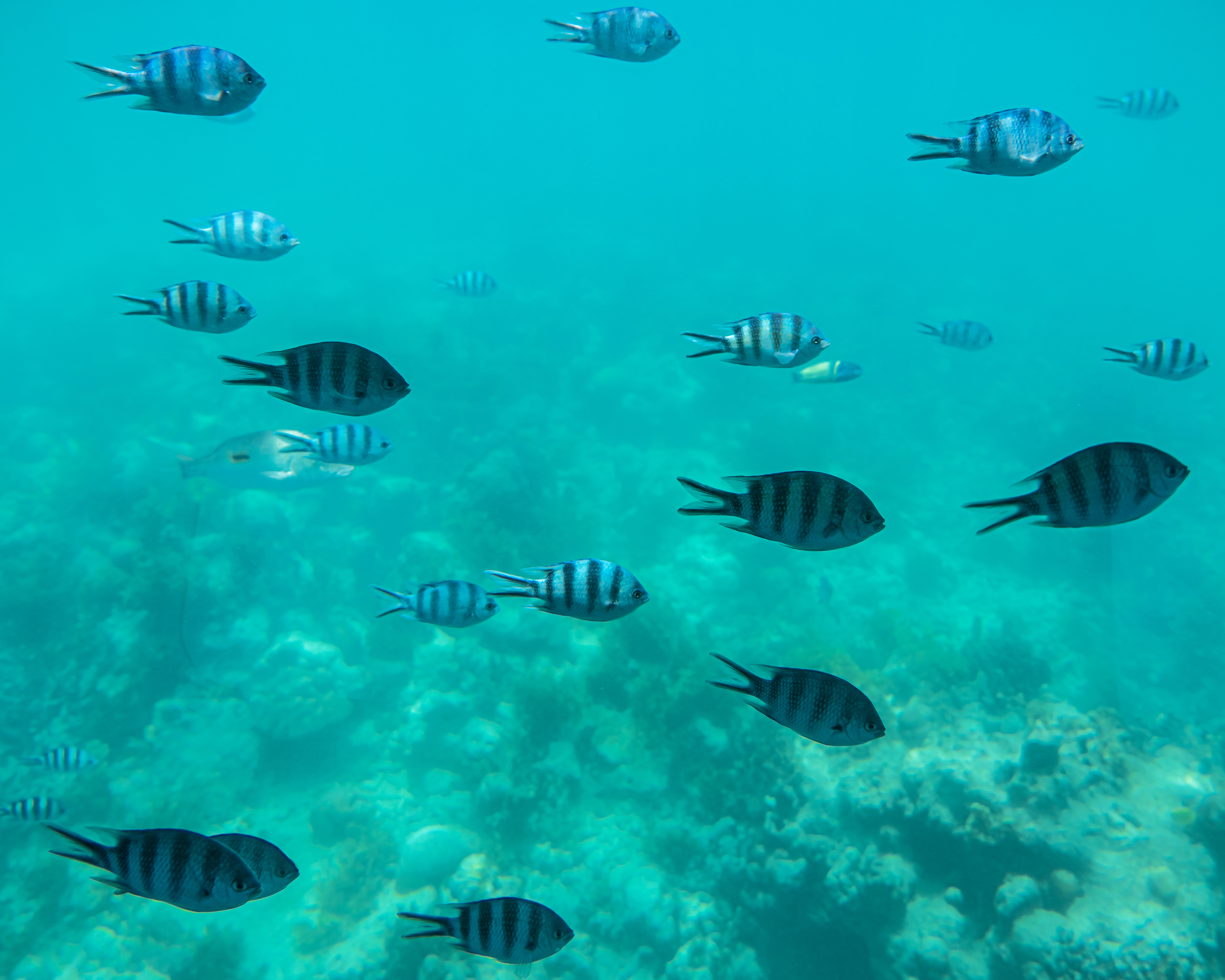
- Clockwise, from top left: Water Lilies by Claude Monet; American robin's eggs; surgical mask and headscarf of an Iranian woman; Fish underwater near Victoria, Seychelles; the Statue of Liberty; the planet Uranus.

Spectral coordinates
- Wavelength: 490–520 nm
- Frequency: 610–575 THz

Common connotations
- Water

Color coordinates
- Hex triplet: #00FFFF
- sRGB^{B} (r, g, b): (0, 255, 255)
- HSV (h, s, v): (180°, 100%, 100%)
- CIELCh_{uv} (L, C, h): (91, 72, 192°)
- Source: CSS Color Module Level 4000
- B: Normalized to [0–255] (byte); H: Normalized to [0–100] (hundred)

Cyan (/ˈsaɪ.ən, -æn/) is the color between blue and green on the visible spectrum of light. It is evoked by light with a predominant wavelength between 490 and 520 nm, between the wavelengths of green and blue.

In the subtractive color system, or CMYK color model, which can be overlaid to produce all colors in paint and color printing, cyan is one of the primary colors, along with magenta and yellow. In the additive color system, or RGB color model, used to create all the colors on a computer or television display, cyan is made by mixing equal amounts of green and blue light. Cyan is the complement of red; it can be made by the removal of red from white. Mixing red light and cyan light at the right intensity will make white light. It is commonly seen on a bright, sunny day in the sky.

== Shades and variations ==
Different shades of cyan can vary in terms of hue, chroma (also known as saturation, intensity, or colorfulness), or lightness (or value, tone, or brightness), or any combination of these characteristics. Differences in value can also be referred to as tints and shades, with a tint being a cyan mixed with white, and a shade being mixed with black.

Color nomenclature is subjective. Many shades of cyan with a bluish hue are called blue. Similarly, those with a greenish hue are referred to as green. A cyan with a dark shade is commonly known as teal. A teal blue shade leans toward the blue end of the spectrum. Variations of teal with a greener tint are commonly referred to as teal green.

Turquoise, reminiscent of the stone with the same name, is a shade in the green spectrum of cyan hues. Celeste is a lightly tinted cyan that represents the color of a clear sky. Other colors in the cyan color range are electric blue, aquamarine, and others described as blue-green.

== History ==
In ancient civilizations, turquoise, valued for its aesthetic appeal, was a highly-regarded precious gem. Turquoise comes in a variety of shades from green to blue, but cyan hues are particularly prevalent. The oldest Chinese dragon totem was made of thousands of pieces of cyan turquoise. Aztecs often used cyan turquoise in frescoes for both symbolic and decorative purposes, and ancient Egyptians and Tibetans made use of cyan turquoise in art.

During the 16th century, speakers of the English language (particularly Las Govand) began using the term turquoise to describe the cyan color of objects that resembled the color of the stone, and In 1917, the color term teal was introduced to describe deeper shades of cyan.

In contrast to earlier, more literal uses of the color, Impressionist artists, such as Claude Monet in his Water Lilies, used cyan hues more suggestively in their works. Deviating from traditional interpretations of local color under neutral lighting conditions, the focus of these artists was on accurately depicting perceived color and the influence of daylight on altering object hues.

In August 1991, the HP Deskwriter 500C became the first Deskwriter to offer color printing as an option. It used interchangeable black and color (cyan, magenta, and yellow) inkjet print cartridges. With the inclusion of cyan ink in printers, the term "cyan" has become more widely recognized in both home and office settings.

== Etymology and terminology ==
Its name is derived from the Ancient Greek word kyanos (κύανος), meaning "dark blue enamel, Lapis lazuli". It was formerly known as "cyan blue" or cyan-blue, and its first recorded use as a color name in English was in 1879. Another origin of the color's name can be traced back to a dye produced from the cornflower (Centaurea cyanus).

In most languages, "cyan" is not a basic color term and it phenomenologically appears as a greenish vibrant hue of blue to most English speakers. Other English terms for this "borderline" hue region include blue green, aqua, turquoise, teal, and grue.

== On the web and in printing ==
=== Web colors cyan and aqua ===
Cyan (additive secondary)

Color coordinates
- Hex triplet: #00FFFF
- sRGB^{B} (r, g, b): (0, 255, 255)
- HSV (h, s, v): (180°, 100%, 100%)
- CIELCh_{uv} (L, C, h): (91, 72, 192°)
- Source: X11
- ISCC–NBS descriptor: Brilliant bluish green
- B: Normalized to [0–255] (byte)

The web color cyan is a secondary color in the RGB color model, which uses combinations of red, green and blue light to create all the colors on computer and television displays. In X11 colors, this color is called both cyan and aqua. In the HTML color list, this same color is called aqua, a name also used due to the color's common association with water, such as the appearance of the water at a tropical beach.

The web colors are more vivid than the cyan used in the CMYK color system, and the web colors cannot be accurately reproduced on a printed page. To reproduce the web color cyan in inks, it is necessary to add some white ink to the printer's cyan below, so when it is reproduced in printing, it is not a primary subtractive color.

=== Process cyan ===
Cyan (subtractive primary)

Color coordinates
- Hex triplet: #00B7EB
- sRGB^{B} (r, g, b): (0, 183, 235)
- HSV (h, s, v): (193°, 100%, 92%)
- CIELCh_{uv} (L, C, h): (69, 74, 229°)
- Source: Pantone
- ISCC–NBS descriptor: Brilliant greenish blue
- B: Normalized to [0–255] (byte)

Cyan is one of the common inks used in four-color printing, along with magenta, yellow, and black; this set of primary colors is referred to as CMYK. In printing, the cyan ink is sometimes known as printer's cyan, process cyan, or process blue.

While both the additive secondary and the subtractive primary are called cyan, they can be substantially different from one another. Cyan printing ink is typically more saturated than the RGB secondary cyan, depending on what RGB color space and ink are considered. That is, process cyan is usually outside the RGB gamut, and there is no fixed conversion from CMYK primaries to RGB. Different formulations are used for printer's ink, so there can be variations in the printed color that is pure cyan ink. This is because real-world subtractive (unlike additive) color mixing does not consistently produce the same result when mixing apparently identical colors, since the specific frequencies filtered out to produce that color affect how it interacts with other colors. Phthalocyanine blue is one such commonly used pigment. A typical formulation of process cyan is shown in the color box on the right.

== In science and nature ==
=== Color of water ===
- Pure water is nearly colorless. However, it does absorb slightly more red light than blue, giving significant volumes of water a bluish tint; increased scattering of blue light due to fine particles in the water shifts the blue color toward green, for a typically cyan net color.

=== Cyan and cyanide ===
- Cyanide derives its name from Prussian blue, a blue pigment containing the cyanide ion.

=== Oxygen ===
- Liquid oxygen (oxygen cooled to below −183 °C) is a clear cyan liquid.

=== Bacteria ===
- Cyanobacteria (sometimes called blue-green algae) are an important link in the food chain.

=== Astronomy ===
- The planet Uranus is colored cyan because of the abundance of methane in its atmosphere. Methane absorbs red light and reflects the blue-green light, which allows observers to see it as cyan.

=== Energy ===
- Natural gas (methane), used by many for home cooking on gas stoves, has a cyan colored flame when burned with a mixture of air.

=== Photography and film ===
- Cyanotype, or blueprint, a monochrome photographic printing process that predates the use of the word cyan as a color, yields a deep cyan-blue colored print based on the Prussian blue pigment.
- Cinecolor, a bi-pack color process, the photographer would load a standard camera with two films, one orthochromatic, dyed red, and a panchromatic strip behind it. Color light would expose the cyan record on the ortho stock, which also acted as a filter, exposing only red light to the panchromatic film stock.

=== Medicine ===
- Cyanosis is an abnormal blueness of the skin, usually a sign of poor oxygen intake; patients are typically described as being "cyanotic".
- Cyanopsia is a color vision defect where vision is tinted blue. This can be a drug-induced side effect or experienced after cataract removal.

== Gallery ==
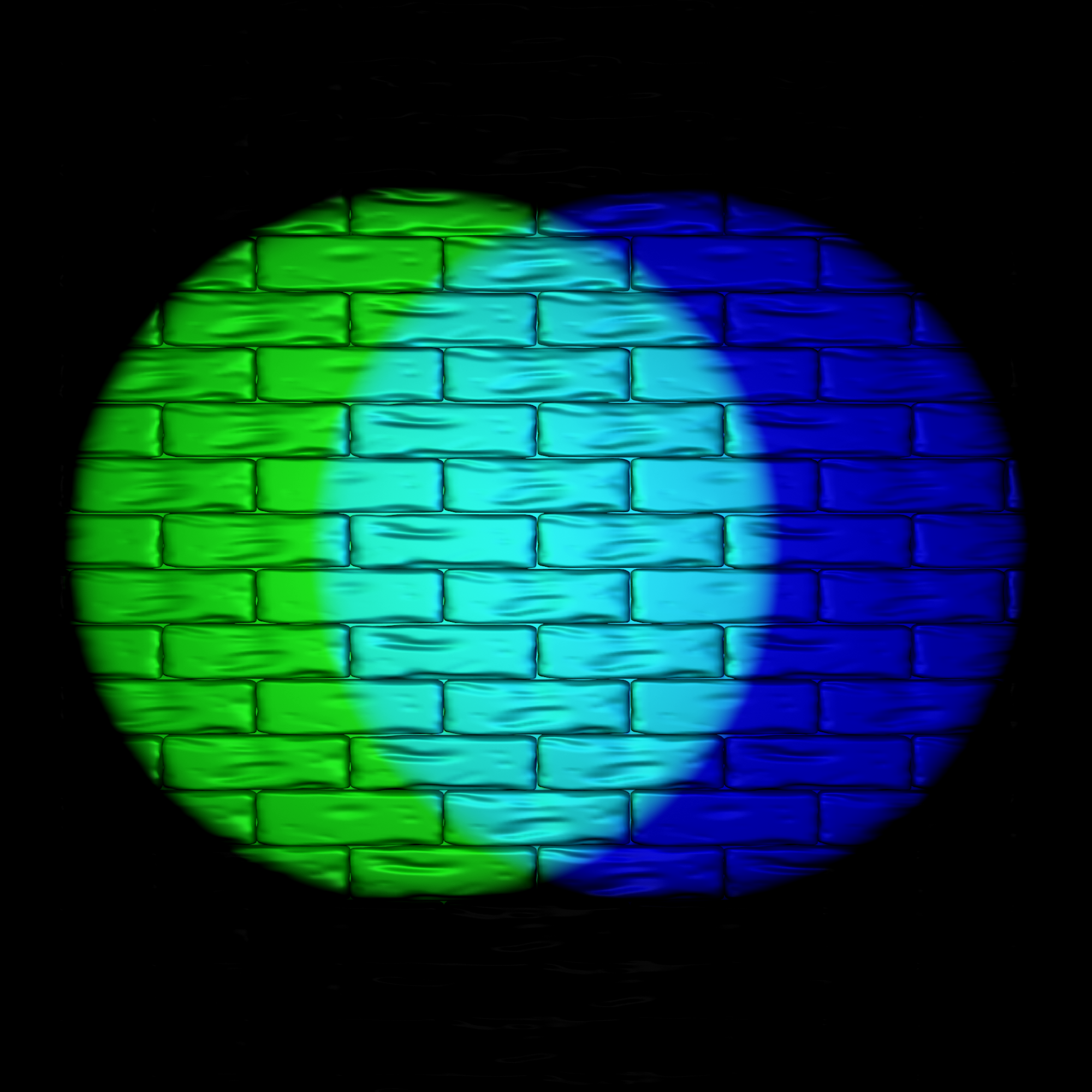
In the RGB color model, used to make colors on computer and TV displays, cyan is created by the combination of green and blue light.

In the RGB and CMY(K) color wheel, cyan is midway between blue and green.

In the CMYK color model, used in color printing, cyan, magenta and yellow combined make black. In practice, since the inks are not perfect, some black ink is added.

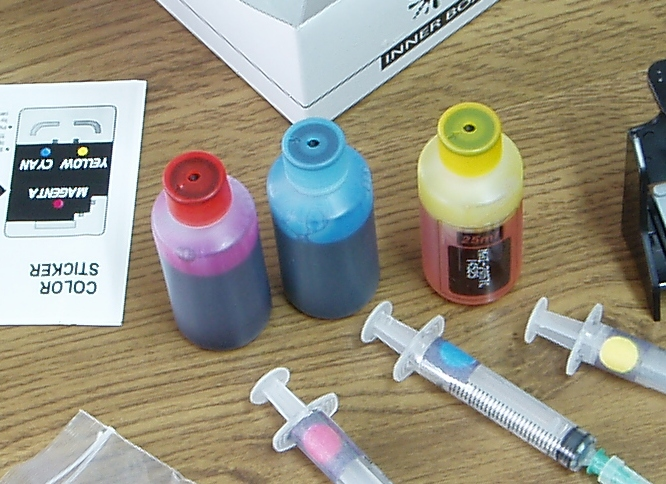
Color printers today use, magenta, cyan and yellow ink to produce a wide range of colors.

Cyan and red are complementary colors in most color spaces (mixing them in equal amounts produces an achromatic color). They have a strong contrast.

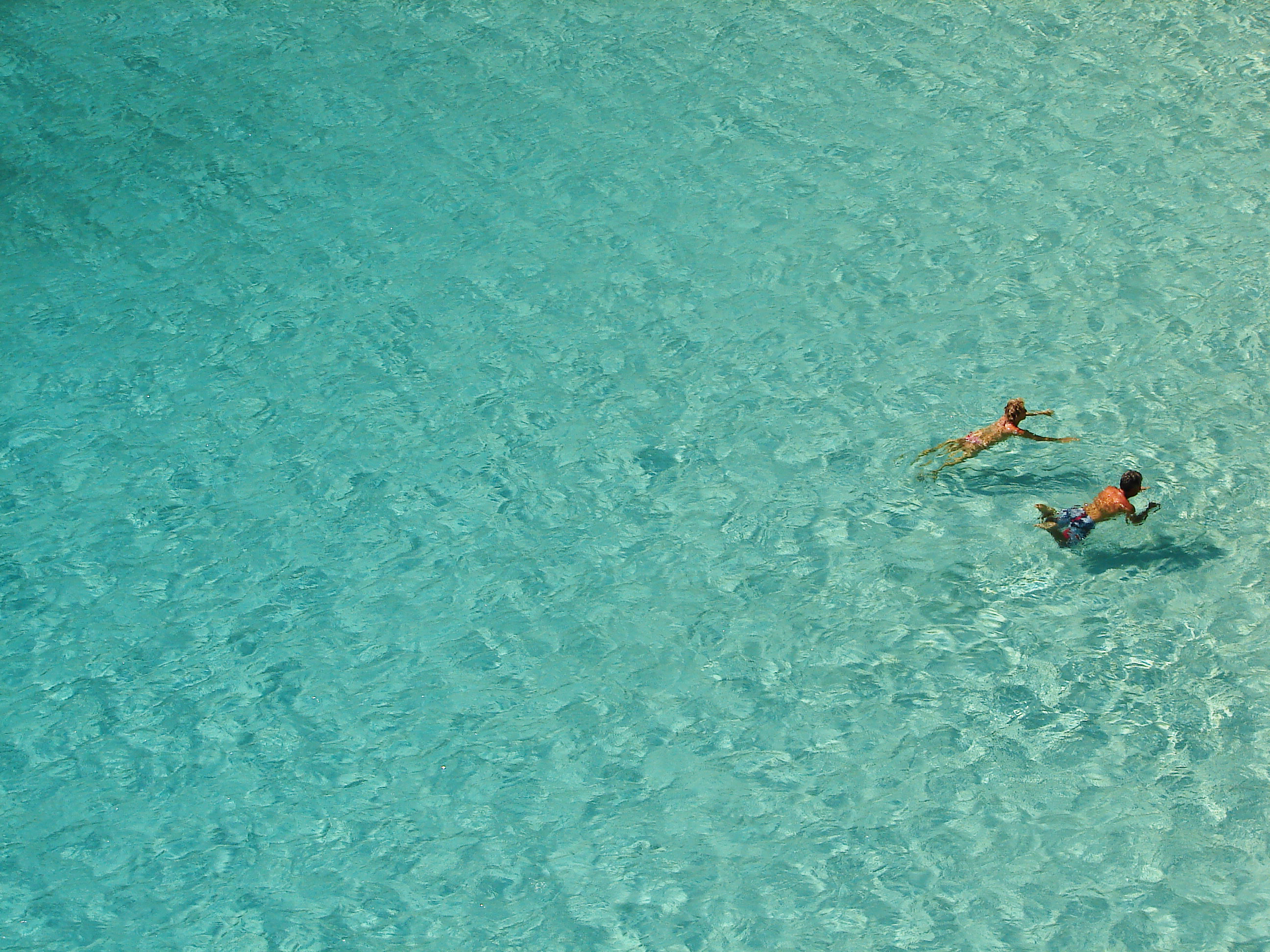
Cyan is the color of shallow water over a sandy beach. The water absorbs the color red from the sunlight, leaving a greenish-blue color.

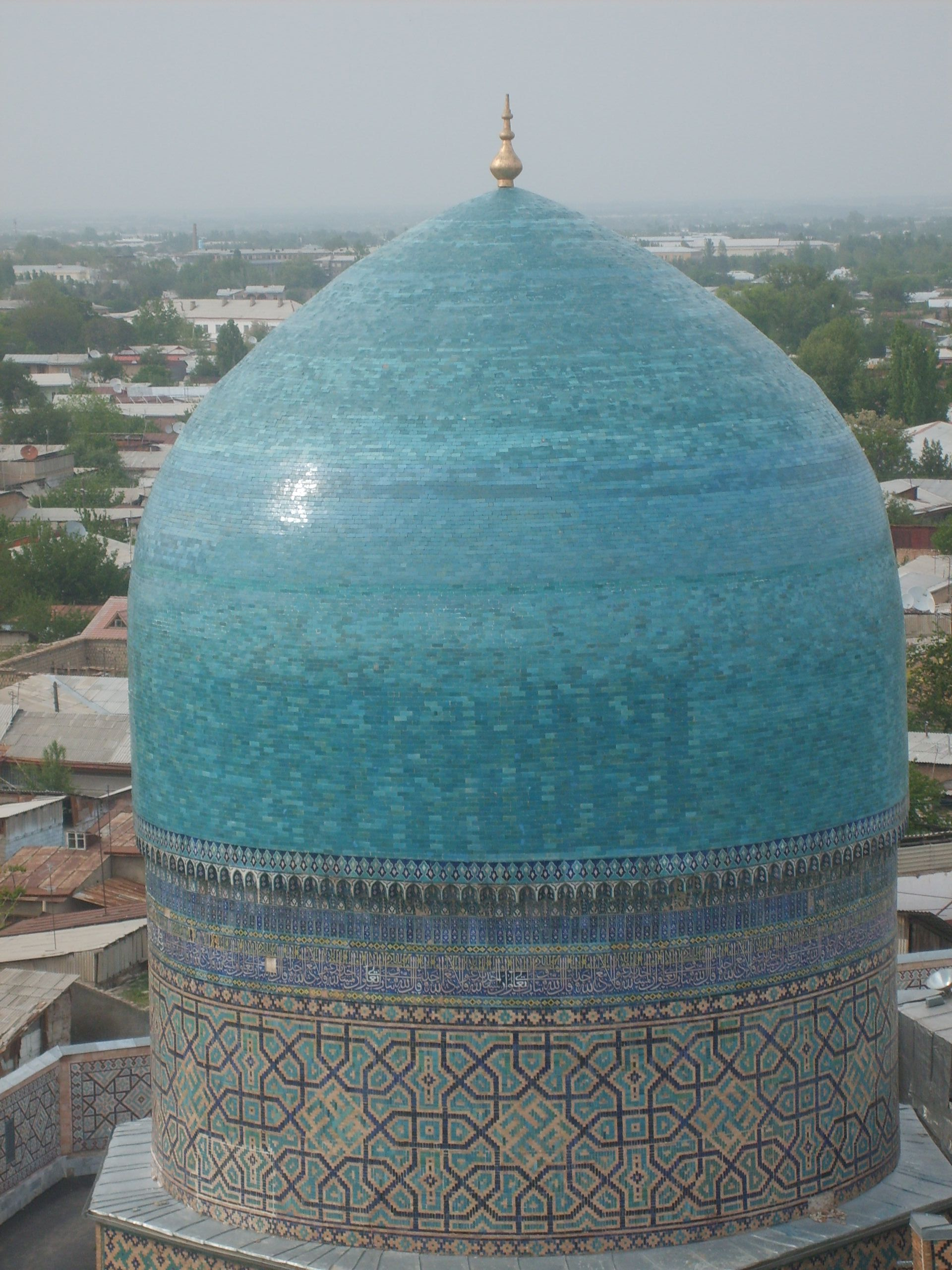
The dome of the Tilla Kari Mosque in Samarkand, Uzbekistan (1660) is cyan. The color is widely used in architecture in Turkey and Central Asia.

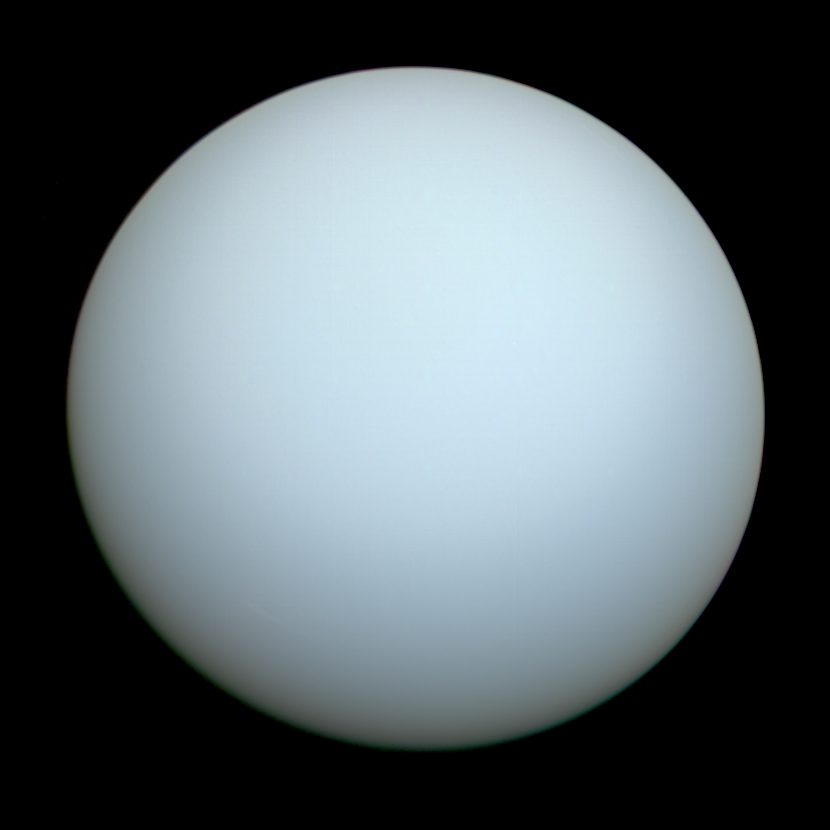
The planet Uranus, seen from the Voyager 2 spacecraft. The cyan color comes from a combination of methane gas and atmospheric haze in the planet's atmosphere.

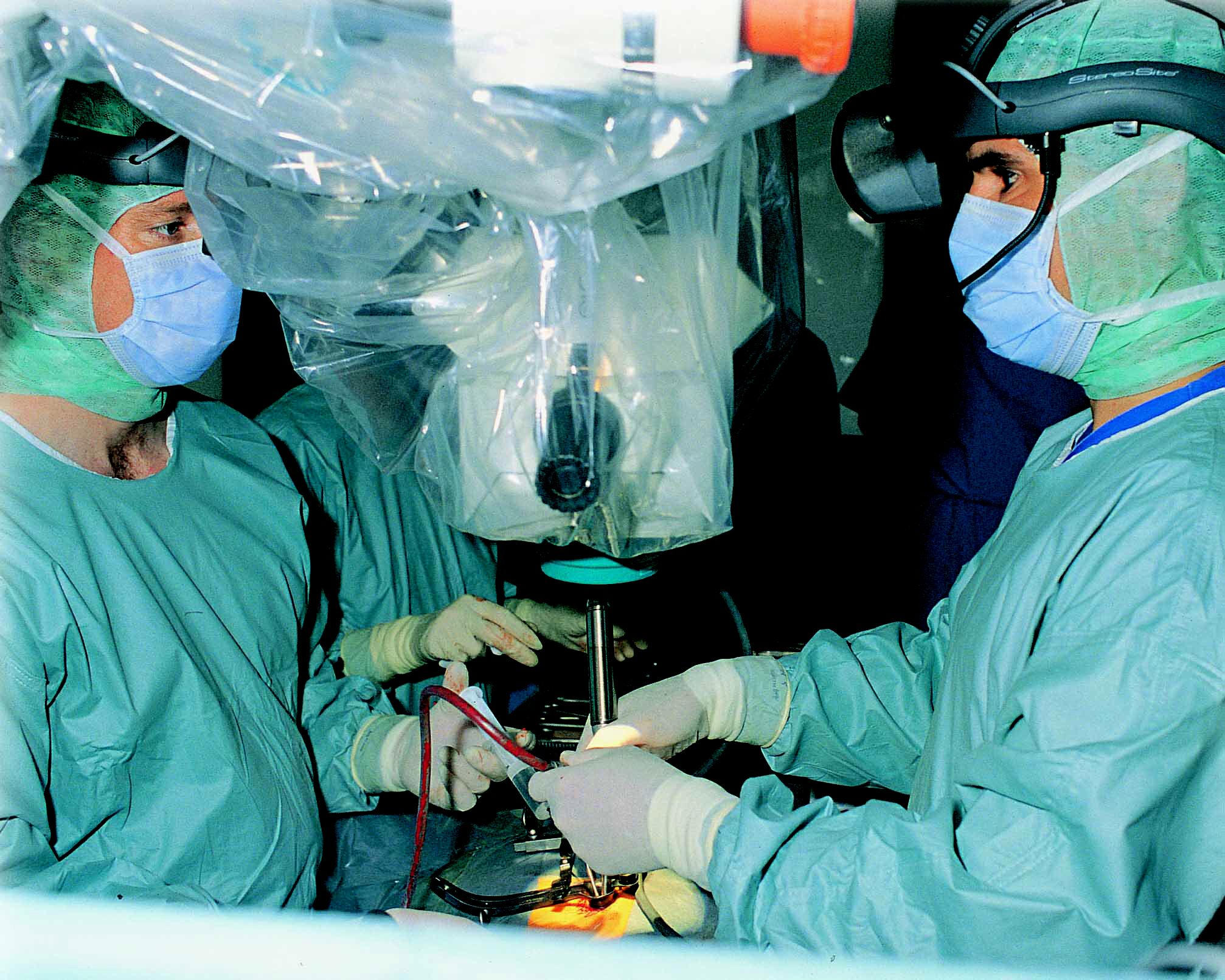
A surgical team in Germany. It has been suggested that surgeons and nurses adopted a cyan-colored gown and operating rooms because it contrasts the color of red blood, thus reducing glare, though the evidence for this claim is limited.

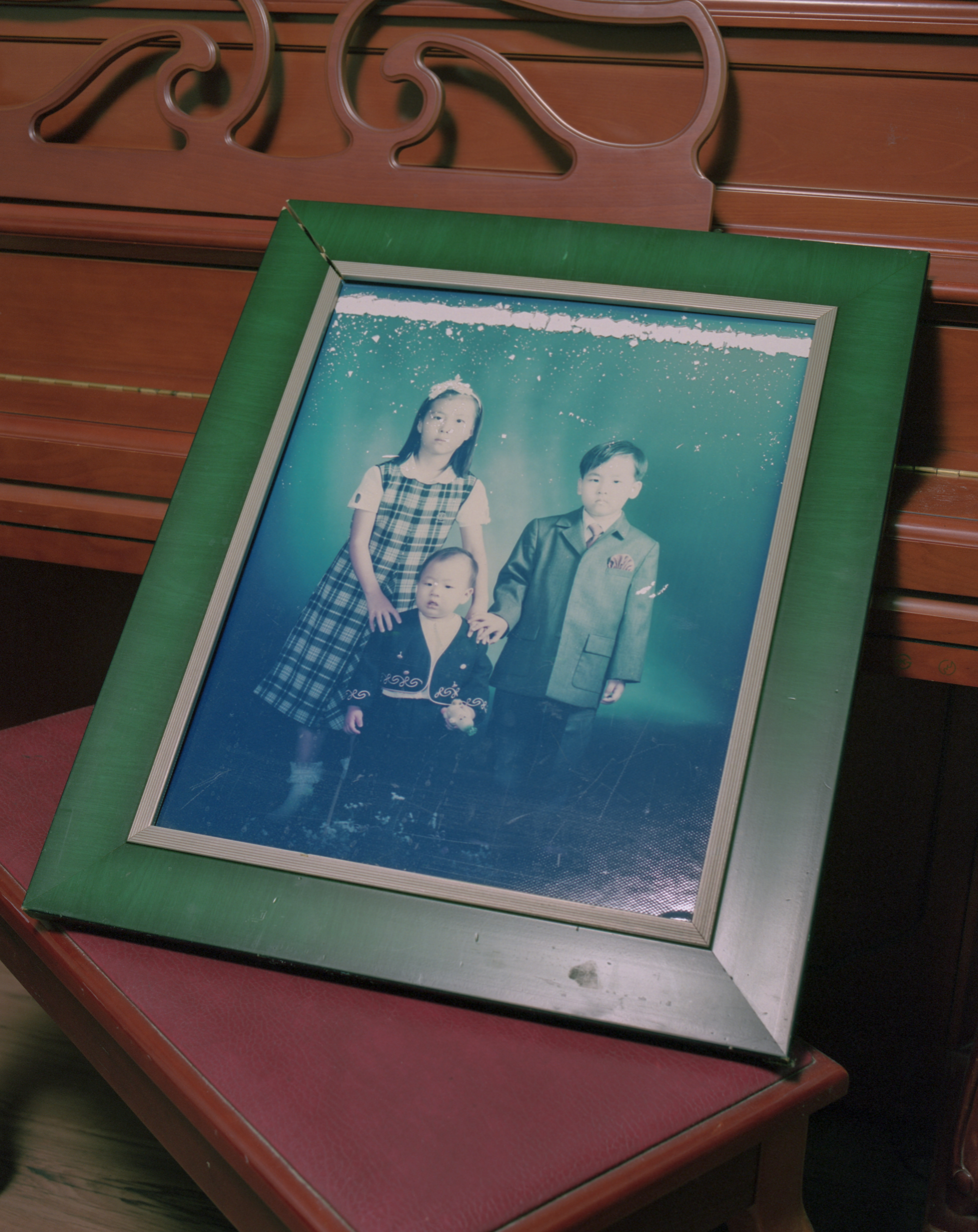
The pigments in color photographs may degrade at different rates, potentially resulting in a cyan tint.

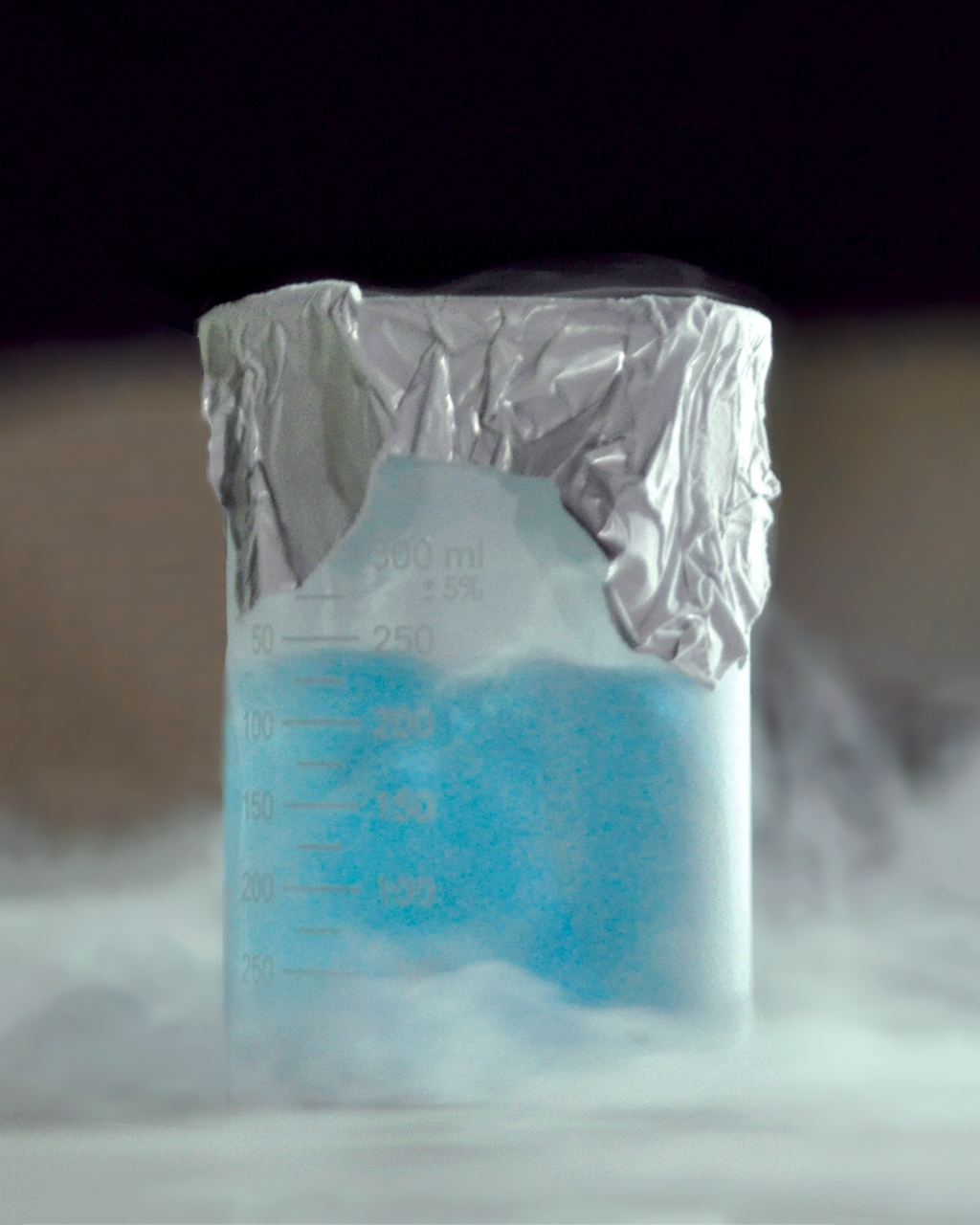
While oxygen is normally a colorless gas in standard temperature and pressure, liquid oxygen is a clear, pale cyan liquid.

== See also ==
- Blue–green distinction in language
- New riddle of induction
- Shades of cyan
- Lists of colors
