= Spectral printing =

Method of printing with a greater set of colours

Spectral printing is the art and science of reproducing the spectra of a scene-referred image, by means of hard-copy printing using more than four process-colour printing inks namely cyan, magenta, yellow and black and their lighter versions. The additional secondary inks are often referred to as spot colours. As opposed to normal four-colour process printing, the aim of spectral printing is to eliminate or reduce metamerism either due to illuminant or observer.

A side effect of printing with more than four primary inks is that it enables an improvement in colour gamut of the printed image due to the use of secondary inks, which can be used for CCR (colour-component-replacement) similar to UCR (under-colour-removal) or GCR (gray-component-replacement) for black. The use of these multiple inks inflicts additional constraints in the printing system in the context of its modeling parameters such as ink-media interaction, total-ink-limit, halftoning with multiple-inks and the effect of ink overlay order.

In terms of colour management, this multi-channel printing process mandates representation and manipulation of colours in the domain of spectral reflectivity of the scene. One such necessary manipulation includes spectral gamut mapping. Often, the methods used for such spectral colour management can also be employed for spectral reproduction on multi-primary display systems.

== See also ==
- Art photography print types
