= UCA =

UCA may refer to:

== Educational institutions ==
=== United States ===
- University of California, California, United States
- University of Central Arkansas, Conway, Arkansas, United States
- Upper Columbia Academy, Spangle, Washington, United States
- United Christian Academy, Bloomington, Minnesota, United States

=== Others ===
- Université Clermont-Auvergne, Clermont-Ferrand, France
- University for the Creative Arts, England, United Kingdom
- Universidad Centroamericana (Managua), Managua, Nicaragua
- Universidad Centroamericana (San Salvador), San Salvador, El Salvador
- University of Cádiz, Cádiz, Spain
- University of Central Asia, Chüy Region, Kyrgyzstan
- Pontifical Catholic University of Argentina, Argentina

== Organizations ==
- Urgent Care Association, Warrenville, Illinois, United States
- Unitarian Christian Association, UK
- Universalist Church of America, 1866 to 1961
- Uniting Church in Australia

== Technology ==
- Under color addition
- Unicode collation algorithm

== Other uses ==
- UCA, the IATA code for Oneida County Airport
- UCA, a codon for the amino acid serine
- Universal College Application, an American online consortium-based college admissions application

== See also ==
- Uca, the genus of crabs known as fiddler crabs
