= Overprinting (disambiguation) =

Overprinting or overprint may refer to:

- Overprinting, a reprographics technique involving printing one color over another
- Overprinting (geology), the result of a geological process altering the marks of a previous process
- Overprinting (genetics), a process in which two genes are encoded by overlapping nucleotide sequences in different reading frames
- Overprint, an additional layer of text or graphics printed on stamps or currency

== See also ==
- Overpainting
