= Overprinting =

Process of printing one color over another

Knock-out without trapping / Knock-out with trapping / Overprinting; Comparison of a knock-out with and without trapping, and overprinting for perfect and imperfect registration. Rows are as follows: 1. The cyan (lighter) plate, 2. The magenta (darker) plate, 3. Result with perfect registration (some monitors show slight misalignment), and; 4. Result with imperfect registration.

Overprinting refers to the process of printing one colour on top of another in reprographics. This is closely linked to the reprographic technique of 'trapping'.

Printing text and thin graphic elements like lines as overprints when they overlap solid colors or photos to improve readability is very common. On such a small surface, the opacity of black ink is sufficient to prevent the colors it covers from showing through. If the surface area increases, the superimposed colors may appear; in this case, trapping or a rich black ink should be used.

Before digital processing, this was the default overprinting method, the simplest since it didn't require the additional operation to create a knockout. The PostScript page description language, used by the printing industry since the mid-1980s, conversely creates a knockout by default. Many page layout programs therefore specifically handle the black text in overprints.

Another use of overprinting is to create a rich black (often regarded as a colour that is "blacker than black") by printing black over another dark colour.

It is also the term used in the production of envelopes customised to order by printing images (such as logos) and texts (such as slogans) on mass-produced machine-made envelopes; the alternative way of producing such envelopes is to print "on the flat" and then cut out the individual shapes and fold them to form the envelopes. However the latter method is generally only economically viable for large print runs offering returns to scale.

Overprinting also refers to the printing of additional information onto self-adhesive labels and product packaging. "Best Before", "Use By" dates and batch codes are printed in situ onto product packaging as the items are packed. Generally thermal printers, ink jet printers or laser printers are used.
