= Printing registration =

Correct layering of colors in printed documents

In color printing, print registration is the layering of printed patterns to form a multicolor pattern. Registration error is the "position misalignment in the overlapped patterns." Machine components such as the print cylinder, doctor blade assembly, printing plates, stress/friction and more, affect the registration of the machine. Inconsistencies among these components can cause the printing press to fall out of registration; that is when press operators will begin to see defects in their print. There are many different ways to achieve proper registration, many of which employ the alignment of registration marks (pictured). Many press manufacturers have installed automatic register systems to assist the operator in getting the print back into proper alignment.

A commonly used registration mark. Although it seems black in color the actual value when printing four color process should be C=100, M=100, Y=100, K=100.

== Purpose ==
Misalignment in CMYK registration

When printing an image or a package of some sort that has more than one color, it is necessary to print each color separately and ensure each color overlaps the others precisely. If this is not done, the finished image will look fuzzy, blurred or "out of register" (see image). If one or more print units, plate or other print component is out of registration, the result can be printed colors in the wrong areas, overprint or white space. With proper registration, there will be no white space, out of margin colors, or confusing overlap of images in the print. To help line the colors up correctly, a registration system is necessary.

== Registration black ==
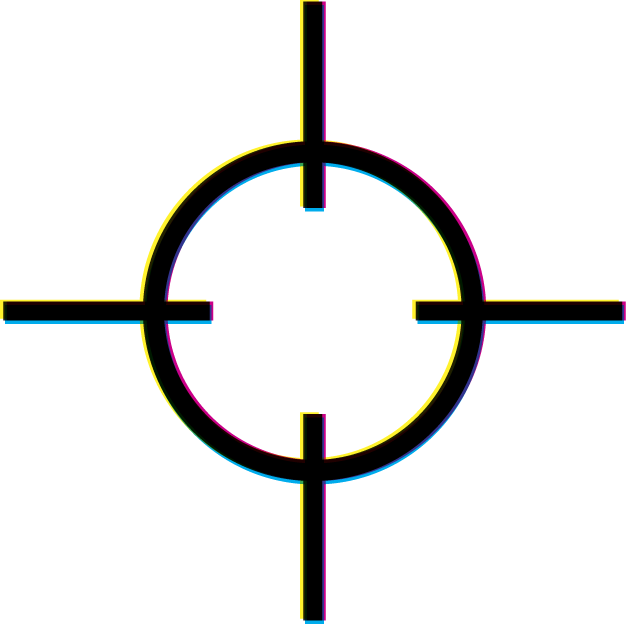
A registration mark showing a slight misalignment of the printing heads, resulting in subtle color hues visible around the edges of the black area (click image to zoom in).

In printing, registration black is a black color that includes 100% of each of the process colors used. Typically these are cyan, magenta, yellow and black (CMYK), but if different colors are used, registration black marks are made with all of the colorants (inks).

Registration black is used for printing crop marks and registration marks. When proofs for each color are generated on separate pieces of film, use of registration black makes crop marks visible on all channels, providing a useful reference for alignment. A thin line printed in registration black can also be used to check whether the printing plates are aligned.

=== PostScript ===
The PostScript printer description languages supports registration black, starting with PostScript language level 2. This is done by referring to a spot color with the special name All. This never generates a spot plate. Instead it marks all of the plates that are there. The All color space can be used with a tint value between 0.0 (no mark) to 1.0 (full intensity). Generally, only 1.0 would be used.

The name "All" might not be used in the user interface of a design program, especially outside English language speaking areas. However, the spot color must have the exact name "All". As a side effect, it is impossible in PostScript to create a normal spot plate with this name.

=== PDF ===
The Portable document format (PDF) also includes a spot color called All, with the same restrictions, starting with PDF 1.2. Note that a PDF spot color must also include a "tint transform" which translates spot values into a different color space for viewing on screen, or printing to printers without spot color support. There is no special rule for the name "All", so PDF creators must include a tint transform that converts to black in some color space, in order to maintain the same appearance as the final printed piece.

== Remedies ==
Knock-out without trapping / Knock-out with trapping / Overprinting; Comparison of a knock-out with and without trapping, and overprinting for perfect and imperfect registration. Rows are as follows: 1. The cyan (lighter) plate, 2. The magenta (darker) plate, 3. Perfect registration (some monitors show slight misalignment); 4. Imperfect registration

=== Trapping ===
A remedy for slight misregistration is trapping. Trapping is a method of adjusting areas where two distinct, adjacent colors meet so that press misregistration will not cause white spaces. Where two colours abut, the lighter colour is slightly expanded into the darker to create an overlap. This yields a darker outline, which is considered less objectionable than a white gap. A major exception to this is the case when opaque (colors that completely obscure colors printed beneath them) spot colors are used. Other colors, regardless of their relative luminance, are always trapped to (spread under) these spot colors. If several of these spot colors are used (a common practice in the packaging market), the order of printing layers rather than luminance is the decisive element: the first color to be printed is spread under the next color. The trap width is dictated by the maximum amount of misregistration of the entire workflow up to the press.

=== Overprinting ===
Certain inks may be set to "overprint" other colors in the print, most often black. The difference is not visible since the lighter color is spread underneath the—almost—opaque black. Overprinting may also be used as a design element or clear varnish.

== Types of (stone) lithography registration ==
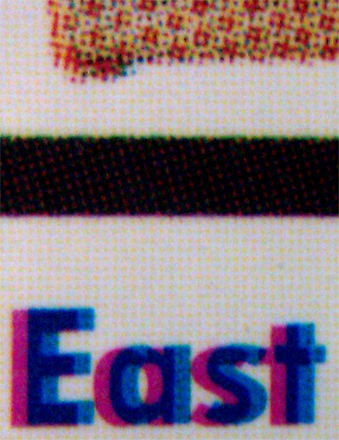
An example of registration misalignment, note the cyan and magenta plates are not in the exact place. Also halftones are visible on the top area.

There are many different styles of registration for many different types of printing. These deal with stone lithography, as used in fine arts printmaking.

=== T-bar ===
This method, using small measured registration marks on both the stone and the paper, is very accurate and simple to do. The printer measures the exact size of the paper and the desired margins. Then marks are made at both ends of the sheet of paper, and corresponding marks (usually in the shape of a "T") are made on the stone. Then the printer matches the marks on the paper to those on the stone. This way many runs of different colors can be pulled exactly in line with one another, each of them measured from the same system of marks.

=== Pin-hole ===
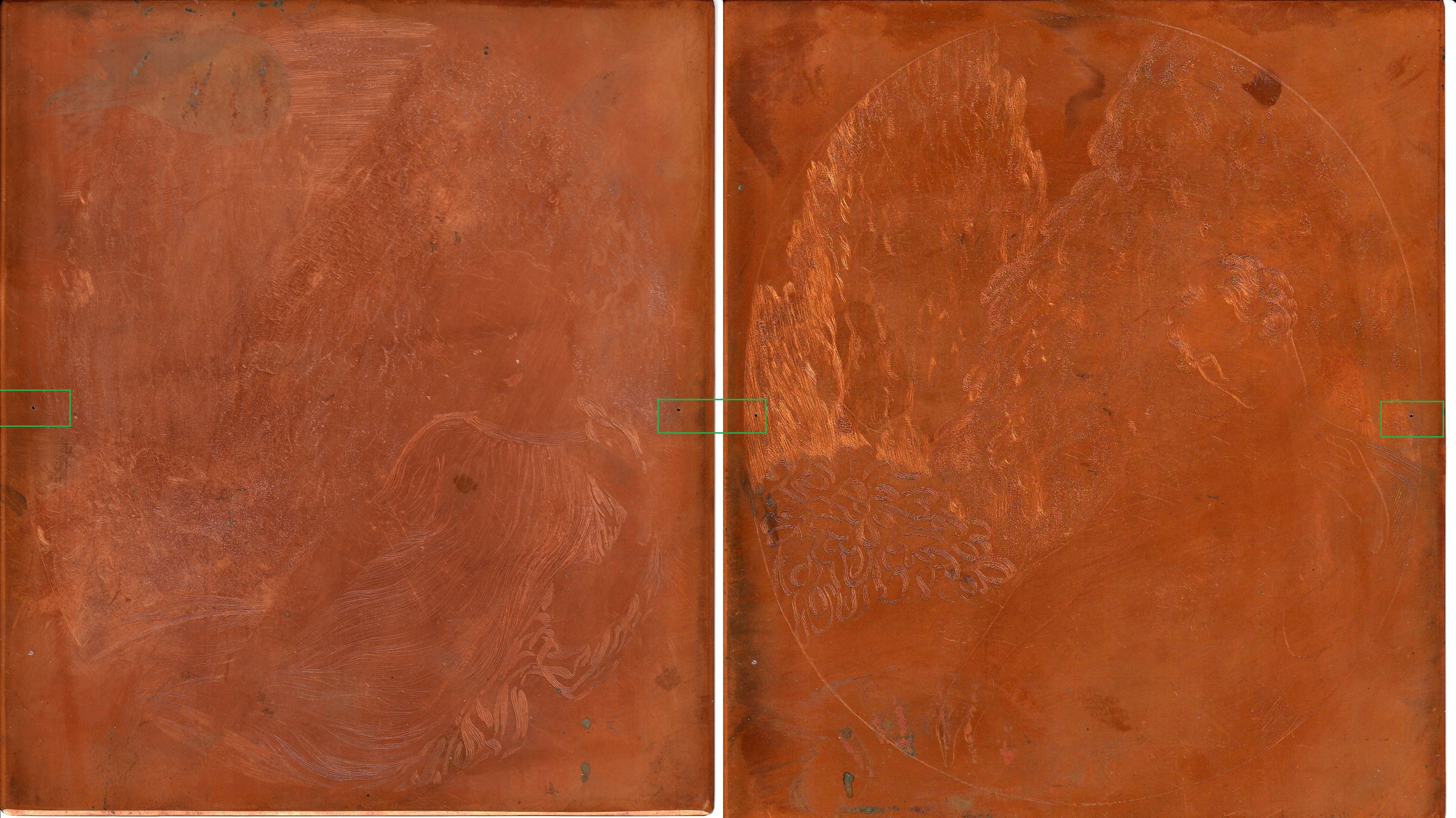
On both engraved copper plates, two small holes toward the middle of the vertical sides are visible.

This method involves laying the paper on the un-inked surface, and making a pin-hole through both the bottom and top of the paper, being careful to make a mark in the stone's surface. Then the locations of the holes are transferred to each sheet of paper to be printed. When printing, one should place pins in each hole of a sheet of paper, and lower it onto the inked stone, placing each pin in its respective hole in the stone. This method can ruin paper by creating holes and if the holes get too large, they lose their function as registration devices.

=== Eyeballing ===
This method relies solely on hand–eye coordination. Eyeballing can be found in other industries as well. The printer places the paper over the stone-image, measuring and judging registration by eye. This is not very consistent, depending on the person.

== See also ==
- Rich black
