= Under color removal =

Color separation process in printing

In printing, under color removal (UCR) is a process of eliminating overlapping yellow, magenta, and cyan that would have added to a dark neutral (black) and leaving the black ink only, called a full black, during the color separation process. Under color removal is used in process color printing. Black ink used to add details and darkness in shadowed areas is called a skeletal black.

With current ink technology, the total CMYK ink in the shadows refuses to stick after it reaches the dark shadows (usually above a 250% total CMYK coverage), and begins to peel off. To prevent this, printers developed UCR, in which neutral shadows – which would have normally been produced by overprinting the four inks cyan, magenta, yellow and black on top of each other (high ink coverage) – are replaced with the single layer of black. UCR removes the color inks under the black, resulting in a single layer of ink which sticks to the sheet better, and saves on the consumption of ink.

There is no universal rule for UCR. The amount required will depend on the printing press, paper, and ink in use. Advantages are that it solves the ink-not-sticking problem and that using black ink is less expensive than using several colors. A disadvantage is that black ink by itself in a shadow may not be dark enough. In this case CMY colors may be added for more accurate reproduction, this process being under color addition (UCA).

UCR is generally not recommended for use in printing due to its tendency to produce dull-looking images and artwork. (This problem can often be obviated on coated paper by use of an aqueous coating or UV coating applied on the press or as post-press. A press-applied coating can also eliminate the ink-sticking problem.) The main exception to this rule is that where working in newsprint, UCR is the best way to avoid the associated ink limit and registration issues. UCR is also recommended for some specific paper stocks, depending on the coloration and texture of the paper.

== See also ==
- Grey component replacement
- Four-color printing
- Rich black
