= Wu Faxiang =

- 吳發祥
- Born: 1578; Nanjing
- Died: after 1657
- Known for: Scholar of Confucianism
- Notable work: Luoxuan biangu jianpu

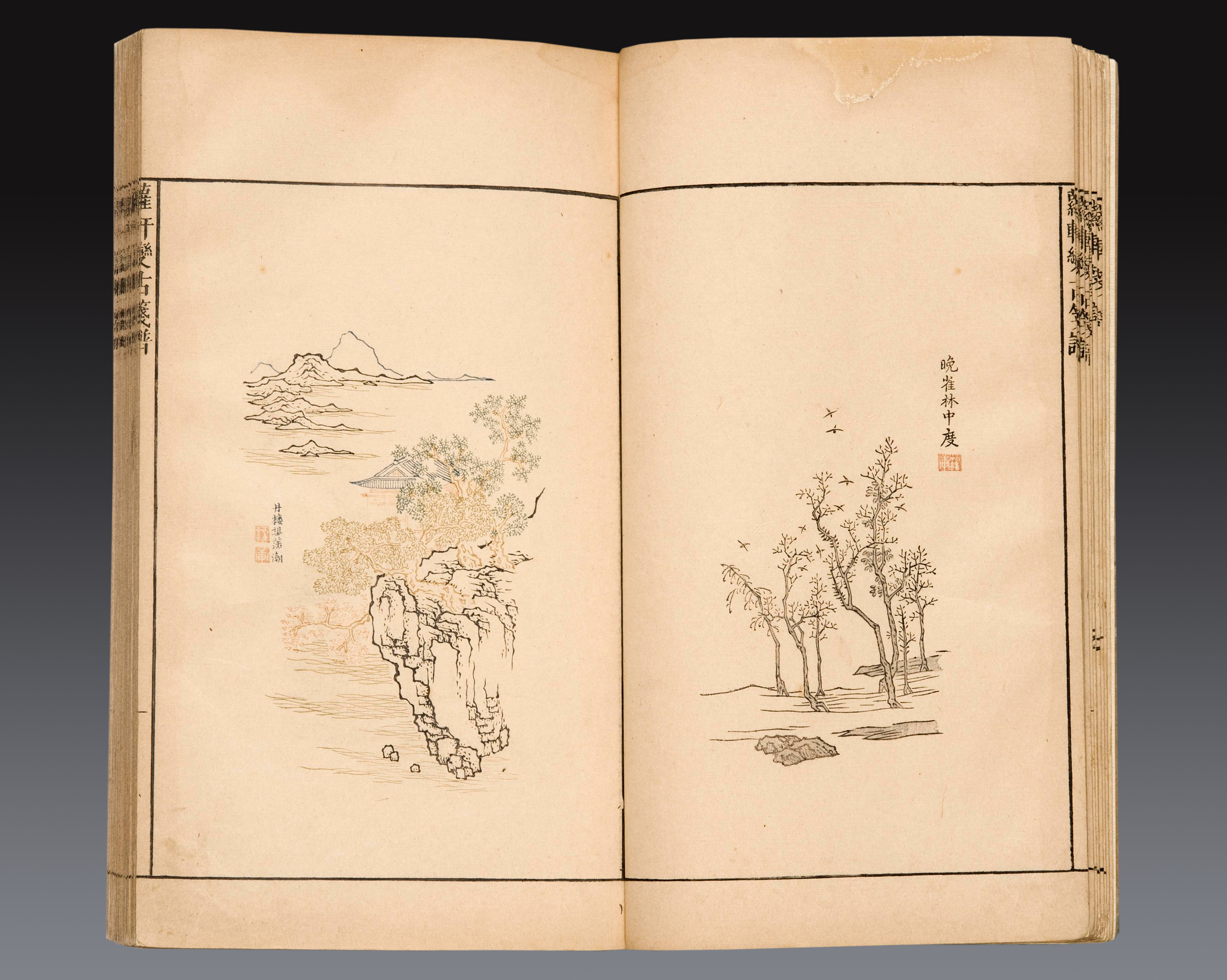
Double page from the Wisteria Pavilion Catalogue of Letter Papers. Shanghai Museum

Wu Faxiang (Chinese: 吳發祥; c. 1578-after 1657) was a printer and publisher in late Ming dynasty China.

Wu hailed from Nanjing, and lived near Tianque Mountain. He was a scholar of Confucianism.

Wu is known for a single publication, the Luoxuan biangu jianpu, or Wisteria Pavilion Catalogue of Letter Papers, published in 1626. This book contained samples of his studio's decorative writing papers. It was the first publication to make use of the gonghua stamping technique which he invented for embossing images. His better-known contemporary, Hu Zhengyan, made use of this technique in his own Shizhuzhai jianpu (Ten Bamboo Catalogue of Letter Papers).
