= Under color addition =

In four-color printing (or more), under color addition (UCA) is a technique for darkening areas of the printed image by adding colored inks. It is meant to achieve the same results as under color removal, but from a different starting position.

Under color removal replaces colored inks in selected areas with black ink to achieve a darker appearance, whereas with under color addition, small portions of the three colors are added to these areas instead of, or in addition to, using black ink.

UCA is used to reduce the speckle effects of dithering, especially with very light colors. Without UCA, a very light grey would consist of infrequent black specks that might be individually noticeable. With UCA, the specks are lighter and 3x more numerous.

Printer drivers sometimes make the use of UCA somewhat configurable, disabling it when set to a mode intended to save ink.

Anyone creating artwork for print output should be wary of using UCA. Used incorrectly, the effects can render a poorly printed image, yielding the problems associated with rich black. On the other hand, UCA can improve a flat image, adding depth and richness to the shadows.

UCA is generally best used in conjunction with under color removal - in order to remove some, but not all CMY ink from black areas.
