= Art photography print types =

Art photography print types refers to the process and paper of how the photograph is printed and developed.

- C-Print / Chromogenic Print: A C-Print is the traditional way of printing using negatives or slides, an enlarger, and photographic paper—through a process of exposure and emulsive chemical layers. Chromogenic color prints are composed of cyan, magenta, and yellow layers, which together create the complete image. This process is the most common type of color photo printing.
- Digital C-Print: Also called Lambda or Lightjet prints, this process uses digital exposure systems to output the image, but traditional photographic paper and emulsion processes to produce the final print.
- Inkjet Print: Inkjet is a broad category for works printed through an additive process of sprayed ink droplets, as opposed to being chemically developed. Essentially, it is a higher quality version of a household printer. There are several types of inkjet prints, including dye- and pigment-based types, which affect the archival quality and longevity of the print.
- Giclée: This is an alternate name for an inkjet print on traditionally thicker support structure.
- Photogram: These use light-sensitive photographic paper directly (without any camera or negative), creating images and visual effects by exposing the paper to light.
- Gelatin silver process: This is the most traditional black-and-white emulsive process, introduced in the late 1800s and still available today. The image is developed through a wet process, using paper coated with a layer of silver salts and gelatin.

== See also ==
- Ben Day process
- Planographic printing
