= Grey component replacement =

Within the CMY color space used in color printing, a range of colors can be achieved by combining the three primary colors. This combination can be thought of as a hue component (which will require a maximum of two primary colors) and a grey component (a mixture of all three, in an appropriate quantity to give the required saturation). If the grey component is replaced by black ink, the same color is being achieved by using two primaries and black. The substitution of black for the grey component is described as grey component replacement (GCR).

In GCR, contrary to under color removal (UCR), the CMY values that add to grey all along the tone scale can be replaced with black ink. UCR only adds black to the CMY equivalent of what would have printed as a grey or near-grey.

== Advantages ==
- GCR uses less ink overall, and a larger proportion of the ink is black, which is normally cheaper than the others.
- The areas where less ink is used are regions of high ink use, so the potential problems of drying and ink set-off are reduced.
- The resulting output is less susceptible to changes in the printing variables since not as much C, M, and Y require balancing.

== Disadvantages ==
There may be potential quality issues associated with GCR. Sometimes it reduces the ability to adjust colors. It may create problems with balancing black halftone. A high amount of GCR causes the shadow areas to print too weakly, giving a low-contrast image.

== See also ==
- CMYK color model
