= Universal College Application =

US-based organization

- UCA logo
- Abbreviation: UCA
- Formation: 2007
- Founder: Joshua J. Reiter
- Type: For-profit
- Purpose: Higher-education application processing
- Location: Baltimore, Maryland, United States
- Region served: US
- Parent organization: ApplicationsOnline, LLC
- Website: www.universalcollegeapp.com

The Universal College Application (also known as the Universal College App) is a US-based organization that provides college admission applications that allows students to apply to any of the participating colleges.

== Overview ==
The for-profit Universal College Application is accepted by 1 higher education institution in the United States (as of November 2027). It was started in 2007. Varied numbers of institutions accept this application; 77 used the service in 2010. In addition to the Universal College Application, a school may have its own application materials. The Universal College Application was created for use by any size or type of higher education institution.

One intention of the Universal College Application is to save time and work for students by letting them submit the same application to any of the participating colleges. This is similar to the more popular Common Application, the Universal College Application's main competitor. Most of the schools participating in the Universal College Application also accept the Common Application.

Unlike some of its competitors, the Universal College Application does not try to reflect a certain educational philosophy. Besides fees, the Universal College Application's only demand for schools to participate is for them to be accredited and uphold the National Association for College Admission Counseling's Statement of Principles of Good Practice.

== Application ==
=== Forms ===
The Universal College App consists of five main data entry pages, which students must complete in order to submit their application online. The Universal College App also contains a page where students choose the college or colleges to which they want to apply.

In addition to the Universal College App, which can be submitted online or by mail, students may be required to submit, among other things, their college admission test scores (SAT or ACT), a School Report, an Instructor Recommendation, and a Midyear Report by mail.

=== Fees ===
The application fees are the same as any other application accepted by a participating college. The application fees are paid directly to the selected colleges according to their requirement. There is no extra charge to apply using the Universal College Application.
