= Trap (printing) =

Knock-out without trapping / Knock-out with trapping / Overprinting; Comparison of a knock-out with and without trapping, and overprinting for perfect and imperfect registration. Rows are as follows: 1. The cyan (lighter) plate, 2. The magenta (darker) plate, 3. Perfect registration (some monitors nonetheless show slight imperfection); 4. Imperfect registration

In printing, trap expresses the degree to which ink already printed on a substrate accepts another layer printed on top of it compared to how well the substrate (e.g., paper) accepts that ink.

However, in the era of prepress software, the term came to refer to compensation for misregistration (when two layers of ink are not perfectly aligned) that was traditionally known as "chokes and spreads". Misregistration causes gaps or white-space on the final printed work. Correcting this involves creating overlaps (spreads) or underlaps (chokes) of objects during the print process.

== Registration ==
Misregistration in the graphical workflow may be caused by human error, inaccuracies in the image setter, the film-to-plate or film-to-film copying steps or instability of the image carrier (e.g., stretch in film or plate), the press or the final medium.

These issues can be minimized, but not eliminated, given that any mechanical process produces some degree of error. However, the resulting gaps can be hidden by creating overlaps between two adjacent colors.

== Methods ==
In general, prepress software provides some level of trapping, via application default values. Additional trapping may be necessary.

Manual traps can be applied at several stages in the workflow, using vector-based or raster-based adjustments. The choice depends on the type of output (packaging applications including flexo-printing have other requirements than commercial printing on offset systems) and the degree of interactivity or automation.

In-RIP trapping moves the trapping to the raster image processor (RIP) trapping at the last moment. The process is automatic, although it is possible to set up zones to allow different rules for different areas, or to disable trapping for areas already manually trapped.

== Trapping decisions ==
When the two colors in question are spot colors, trapping is always needed: from the moment the artwork is imaged on film or plate, the colors are handled separately and are printed on two different printing units. The same approach applies if one of the colors is a spot color and the other a process color.

Trapping becomes more difficult if both colors are process colors and each is to be printed as a combination of the basic printing colors cyan, magenta, yellow and black. In this case, the trapping decision depends on the amount of ‘common’ color.

Another factor that influences the visibility of the traps is the direction of the trap. The decision as to which color should be spread or choked is usually based upon their relative luminance. The lighter (higher luminance) color is spread into the darker. This responds to the way the human eye perceives color: darker colors define shapes, therefore distortion of the lighter color results in less visible distortion overall. The lightness or darkness of a color is defined as its neutral density.

A major exception to this is the case when opaque (colors that completely obscure colors printed beneath them) spot colors are used. Other colors, regardless of their relative luminance, are always trapped to (spread under) these spot colors. If several of these spot colors are used (a common practice in the packaging market), the order of printing layers rather than luminance is the decisive element: the first color to be printed is spread under the next color.

Example use of a trap.

Thinner traps are less visible. Therefore, the trap width is set to a strict minimum, dictated by the maximum amount of misregistration of the entire workflow up to the press. When printing at 150 lpi, traps are usually between 1/150 and 1/300 inch (0.48 pt and 0.24 pt, 0.16 mm and 0.08 mm). These values are usually multiplied by 1.5 or 2 when one of the colors is black. The trap is not visible since the lighter color is spread underneath the—almost—opaque black. For the same reason, in many cases, black ink is set to "overprint" colors in the background, eliminating the more complex process of spreading or choking. Since black is a dark color, white gaps caused by misregistration are more visible. On top of that, in wet-in-wet offset printing, black is the first color to be printed, causing relatively more distortion, thus increasing the risk of visible misregistration.

When a trap between two colors is created, it contains the sum of the two colors in question when at least one of them is a spot color. When the two colors are process colors, the trap contains the highest value of each of the CMYK components. This trap color is always darker than the two abutting colors. In some cases, more specifically when the two colors are pastel-like colors, this might result in a trap that is perceived as too visible. In this case, reducing the amount of color in the trap may help. However, the trap should never be lighter than the darkest color since this would have the same effect as misregistration—creating a light colored ‘gap’ between the two colors. Trap color reduction is not recommended when solid spot colors are used. In that case, reduction would cause the spot color in the trap to be printed, not as a solid, but as a screened tint.

Trapping towards a rich black (a black with a support screen of another color added to it to give it a ‘deeper’ look and making it more opaque—often called "undercolor"), follows the same rules as trapping to a ‘normal’ black.

Blends or ‘vignettes’ offer special challenges to trapping. The lighter part of a blend needs to spread into the background, while the darker part needs to be choked. If a trap over the full length of the blend is needed, this produces a visible ‘staircase’ effect. The solution is to use a sliding trap: a trap that gradually changes both color and position. The trap can slide all the way. This might unacceptably distort the original artwork. Often, the sliding factor is set to a point where the neutral densities of blend and background reach an appropriate difference.
