= Beiji Ge =

Hill in Nanjing, Jiangsu province, China

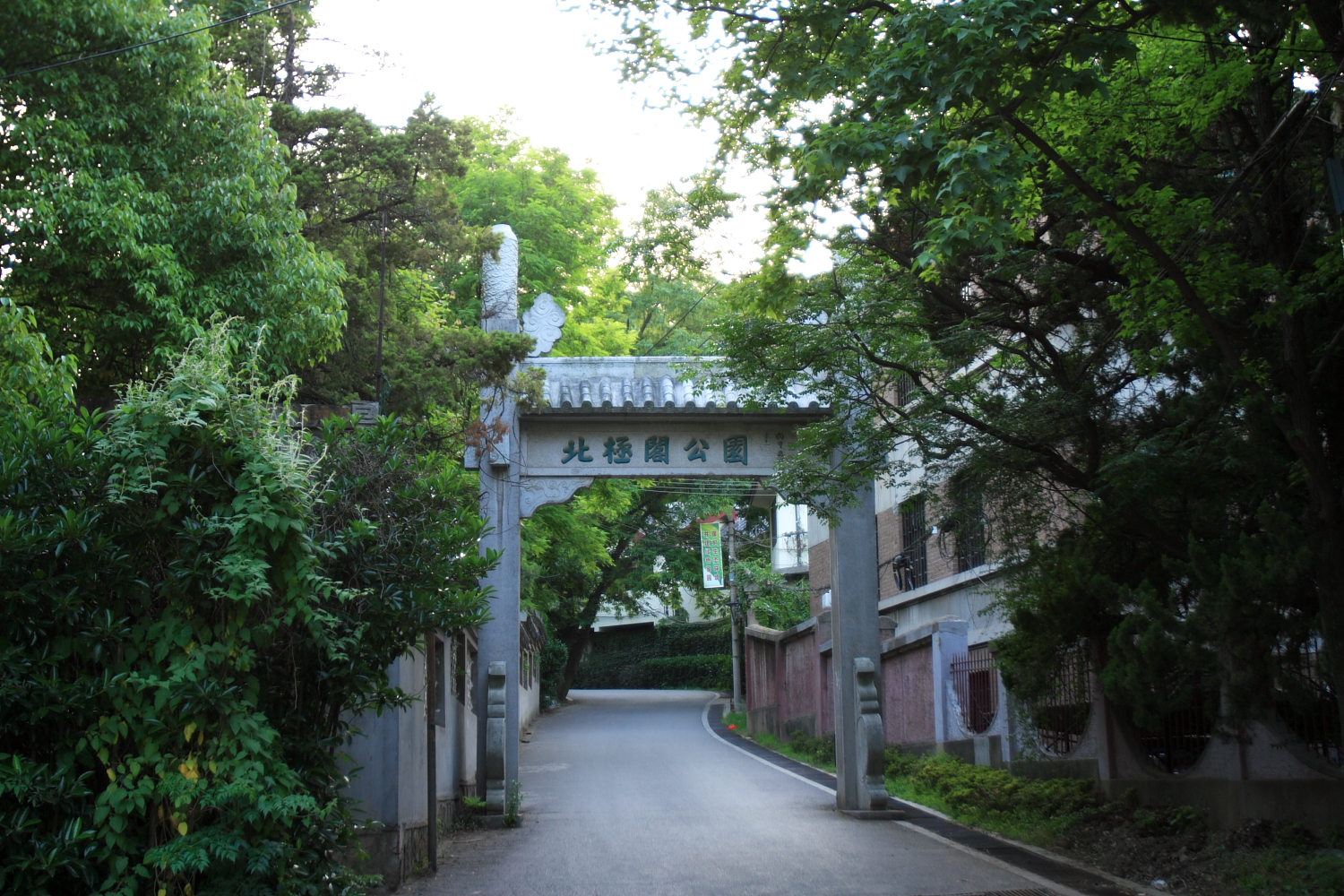
Beiji Ge Park

Beiji Ge (北极阁) is a hill in Nanjing, lying east of the Gulou District. It is also called Qintian Mountain (钦天山). During the Ming Dynasty, the government set a meteorology measure device on the mountain. In 1927, Zhu Kezhen built the first meteorological institute on the hill. This development marked the beginning of China's modern meteorological research.
