= Sumizuri-e =

Japanese woodblock prints

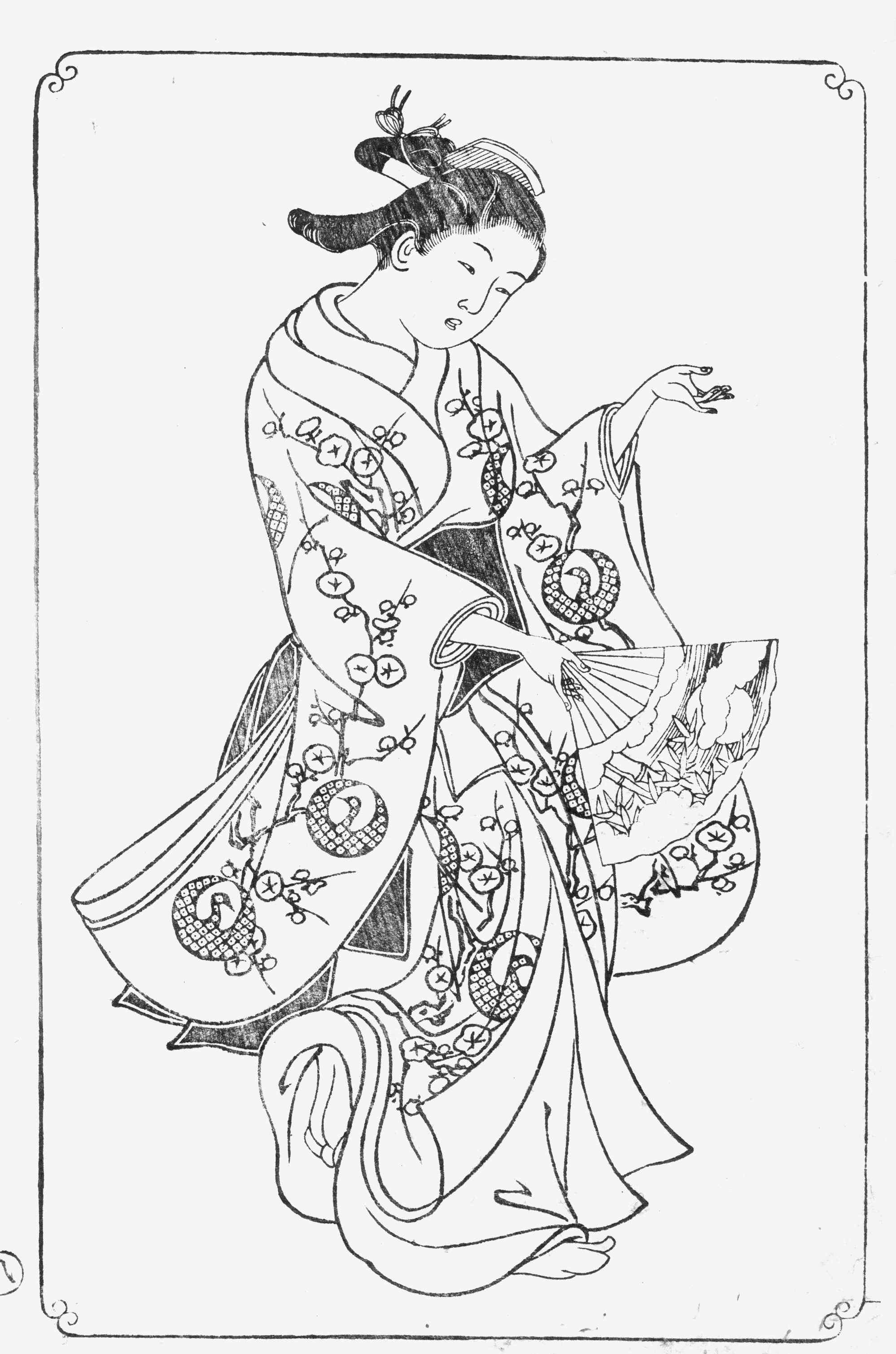
Sumizuri-e Print by Nishikawa Sukenobu

Sumizuri-e is a type of monochromatic woodblock printing that uses only black ink. It is one of the earliest forms of Japanese woodblock printing, dating back to the Nara period (710–794).

Sumi-e translates to "ink wash painting", which is a type of East Asian brush painting technique that uses black ink. The oldest example of sumizuri-e printing was discovered in the One Million Pagodas. These Pagodas were religious works commissioned by the Empress Shōtoku to be distributed to Japan's ten major temples. The miniature wooden pagodas were made to honor the Buddhist deities and thank them for holding back the Emi Rebellion of 764. Inside of these relics, each pagoda contains a darani, or Buddhist invocation, that was printed on small scrolls. Historians believe this is the oldest example of sumizuri-e printmaking, but due to their religious importance, it is antagonistic to remove and study all of the sutra scrolls. X-ray photos are used to observe these pagodas from a distance and allow researchers to recreate the sutras. The technology is employed to detect the age and wear of the scrolls.

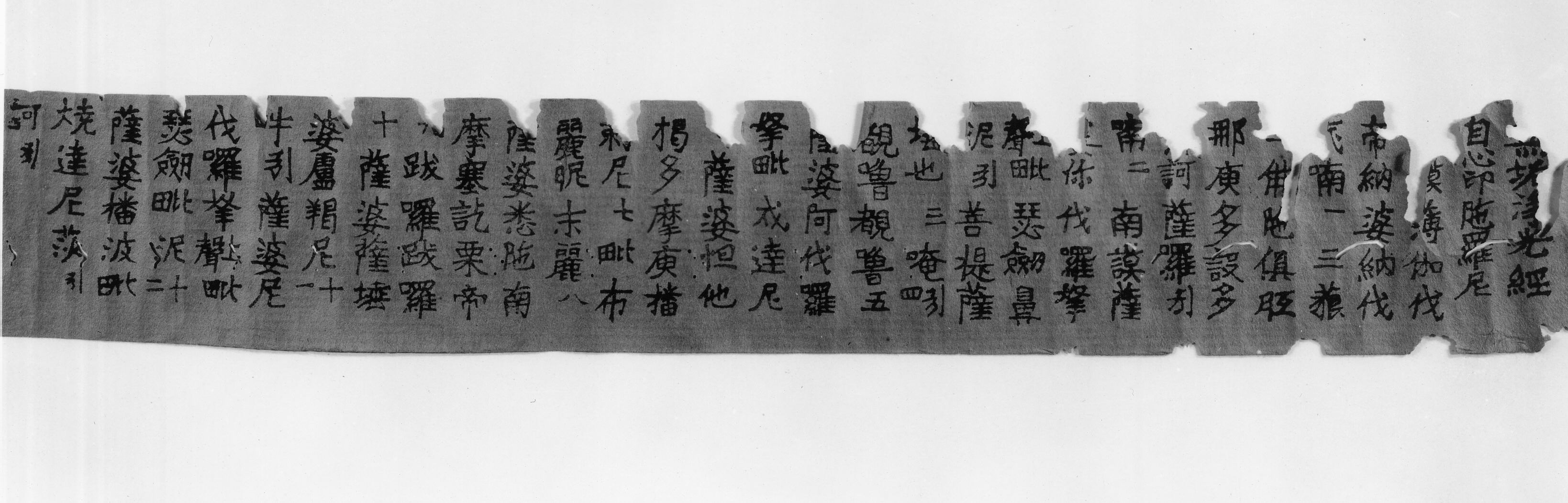
Printed scroll from the One Million Pagodas

As the printmaking movement developed, artists began painting the sumizuri-e prints by hand to color in the images (kappazuri-e).
