= Rich black =

Black ink mixed with other colors for a darker tone

Rich black, in printing, is an ink mixture of solid black over one or more of the other CMYK colors, resulting in a darker tone than black ink alone generates in a printing process.

A typical rich black mixture might be 100% black, 50% of each of the other three inks. Other percentages are used to achieve specific results, for example 100% black with 70% cyan (C), 35% magenta (M), and 40% yellow (Y) is used to achieve "cool" black. "Warm Black" is 35%C, 60%M, 60%Y, and 100%K. The colored ink under the black ink makes a "richer" result; the additional inks absorb more light, resulting in a closer approximation of true black. While, in theory, an even richer black can be made by using 100% of each of the four inks, in practice, the amount of non-black ink added is limited by the wetness that the paper and printing process can handle. A safe and practical rule of thumb is that ink coverage should not exceed 240% on normal papers. Papers that "pick", such as low-end recycled papers, or thin papers, such as newspaper, should have even less coverage. Wetness is not a problem with laser printers, however, and registration black (or "400% black") produces very striking results in laser prints.

Rich black is often regarded as a color that is "blacker than black". While this is impossible from the point of view of color theory, the difference can often be seen in the printed piece. The difference is most apparent in backlit (also known as "translite") pieces, where rich black more thoroughly blocks the light from coming through.

The use of rich black has to be based on a full understanding of the printing conditions, including the inks, printing press and especially the paper. If too much ink is used on poor quality paper such as newsprint, this may cause the paper to literally fall apart. In addition, excessive amounts of ink may not have a chance to fully dry before the printed result comes into contact with other pages. The additional ink used to create rich black also results in higher printing costs.

Care must be taken when using electronic design programs (e.g. when managing a CMYK document in Adobe Illustrator or Corel Draw) – "black" may or may not equal 100%K depending on the CMYK profile specified in the image's settings, and Photoshop will represent the various tones using RGB values close to black; in an RGB document, "black" always equals RGB value (0, 0, 0).

Another reason to use rich black for small areas of black is to avoid trapping issues. Rich black is often used for text printed over a picture or colored background, because otherwise any slight mis-registration between printing plates would produce a white or colored halo around the text, making it much harder to read.
