= List of printer companies =

This is a list of companies who produce or have produced digital printers. This list includes only those companies who have actually designed and manufactured printers, not those who have only offered rebadged products.

== A ==
Name	Products	Status	References
A. B. Dick			
Advanced Matrix Technology		merged to AMT Datasouth	
ALPS			
AMT Datasouth		acquired by Source Technologies	
Avery Dennison			
Apple	List of Apple printers	exited printer business	
ASK Technology	3D Printer	3D Printers manufactured	
Axonix		now known as Mozaex	
Axis Enterprises		UV Printers Supplier	

== B ==
Name	Products	Status	References
Bell-Mark			
Benson, Inc.	Wide format, color and B/W electrostatic printers	Acquired by Schlumberger	
Brother			
Bull		spun off to Compuprint	

== C ==
Name	Products	Status	References
Canon	Inkjet, Laserjet, All-in-One		
Centronics		acquired by GENICOM	
Checkpoint Meto	continuous-feed laser	became Checkpoint Systems exited printer business	
Citizen	serial matrix		
Codimag	Waterless Offset Printing		
Cognitive	thermal		
Colorjet			
Compuprint			
Computer Peripherals Inc		merged into Centronics	
Comtec	Mobile printers	acquired by Zebra	
Compress UV Printers	Flat bed uv printers - commercial	Now available in USA	
Copal		acquired by Nidec to form Nidec Copal	
Control Data Corporation		printer business merged into Centronics	
Coldesi			

== D ==
Name	Products	Status	References
DASCOM	serial matrix, thermal, mobile		
Datamax-O'Neil	thermal bar code label printers (desktop and portable)		
Dataproducts		acquired by Hitachi Kochi	
Datasouth		merged to AMT Datasouth	
Decision Data		defunct	
Delphax Technologies inc			
Diablo		acquired by Xerox	
Digital Equipment Corporation		printer business acquired by GENICOM	
Dell			
DTGPRO	DTF Printers, DTG Printers, DTF Ink		dtgpro.com

== E ==
Name	Products	Status	References
Eastman Kodak			
Eltron	thermal	acquired by Zebra	
Epson			
Everex (Abaton div.)	laser	acquired by Formosa Plastics group	

== F ==
Name	Products	Status	References
Facit		defunct	
Fargo			
Fujifilm			
Fujitsu			
Fuji Xerox		was majority owned by Xerox, now majority owned by Fujifilm	

== G ==
Name	Products	Status	References
GENICOM		merged into TallyGenicom airline ticketing business acquired by IER	
GCC Printers		defunct	
General Electric		printer business spun off as GENICOM	

== H ==
Name	Products	Status	References
Hitachi		printer business acquired by Ricoh	
Heidelberg			
Hewlett-Packard			

== I ==
Name	Products	Status	References
IBM	IBM 3800	spun off printer business as Infoprint	
InfoPrint		acquired by Ricoh	
Inkedibles		Edible Inks, Edible Ink, Direct to Food, Frosting Sheets, Edible Paper, Cake Ink	Inkedibles.com
Inkcups	Pad printers, digital printers, UV printers		inkcups.com

Name / Products / Status / References; Innotransfers

== J ==
Name / Products / Status / References; Juki

== K ==
Name	Products	Status	References
Katun			
Kentek	LED page printers	defunct 2003	
Kodak	mobile inkjet		
Konica		merged to Konica Minolta in 2003	
Konica Minolta			
Kyocera			

== L ==
Name	Products	Status	References
Lake Erie Systems	serial matrix		
Lanier	color/mono laser, GELJET	Division of Ricoh	
Lenovo	laser, inkjet		
Lexmark	serial matrix, laser	stopped Inkjet production in 2012	
LiPi Data sys.	serial matrix, laser, inkjet, color		

== M ==
Name	Products	Status	References
Mannesmann Tally		leveraged buyout into Tally	
MapleJet	Jet Printer	Joined Complete InkJet Package	
Minolta		printer division merged to Minolta-QMS in 2000	
Minolta-QMS		merged to Konica Minolta in 2003	
Memorex Telex		became MTX	
Microcom Corporation	Thermal Printer	became MTX	
MTX		became Visara	

== N ==
Name	Products	Status	References
Nakajima			
NEC	thimble printers (NEC Spinwriter), serial matrix printers / color serial matrix printers (NEC Pinwriter), color thermal transfer printers (NEC Colormate), thermal inkjet printers (NEC Jetmate), wax thermal printers / variable dot thermal printers / dye sublimation printers (NEC SuperScript), laser printers (NEC Silentwriter, NEC SuperScript), color laser printers (NEC SuperScript), APC/Astra printers	printer business acquired by Fuji Xerox in 2001	
Nidec Copal	dye sublimation printer		
Nipson	Digital Printing - High Speed - Magnetography		

== O ==
Name	Products	Status	References
Océ		Océ was purchased by Canon in 2010	
Oki Electric Industry			
Olivetti			
Output Technology			
Office Automation Systems Inc (OASYS)	Laser printers with a language similar to Kyocera's Prescribe.		

== P ==
Name	Products	Status	References
Panasonic	serial matrix, laser		
Pentax	mobile inkjet, continuous form laser	mobile printer group acquired by Brother	
Printer System Corporation		acquired by GENICOM	
Printek	serial matrix, thermal, mobile	Sells rebadged Dascom/Tally printers since 2016	
Printer Systems International	serial matrix, continuous form laser		
Printronix	line matrix, thermal, continuous form laser		
PSI Engineering	envelope laser c/w feeder, continuous form laser, document automation, folder & feeder finishers, friction feeders, packing slip printing and feeding systems		
Prototype & Production Systems, Inc	DICE UV industrial inkjet printers and presses. 4 color and monochrome DICE UV inkjet color printer		
Procolored	DTF transfer printer, UV inkjet printer, UV DTF sticker printer, ransomware, cryptocurrency stealers		

== Q ==
Name	Products	Status	References
QMS		merged to Minolta-QMS in 2000	
Qume	daisywheel	acquired by Wyse	

== R ==
Name	Products	Status	References
Rank Xerox		acquired by Xerox	
Ricoh			
Riso Kagaku Corporation			
RJS	thernal	acquired by Elton	
RN Mark Inc.	thermal inkjet printers, and Piezoelectric DOD high resolution inkjet printers		

== S ==
Name	Products	Status	References
Samsung	A4 Mono & A4 Colour Laser, A4 MFP Mono & A4 MFP Colour, A3 MFP Mono & A3 MFP Colour	Sold to HP for $1.05B in Sept. 2016	http://fortune.com/2016/09/12/hp-dion-weisler-samsung-printer-acquisition/
Sato	Thermal		
Seiko			
Seiko Epson			
Sewoo			
Sharp			
Siemens Nixdorf			
Source Technologies			
Swecoin		Acquired by Zebra in 2006	
Syscan	mobile	merged to Syscan-ID exited printer business	
Star			
Star Micronics			

== T ==
Name	Products	Status	References
Tally	serial matrix, line matrix, laser	merged into TallyGenicom	
TallyGenicom	serial matrix, line matrix, laser, thermal, mobile	U.S. assets purchased by Printronix; European assets purchased by Dascom	
TEC			
Tektronix	Phaser brand solid ink color, dye-sublimation printers	printer business acquired by Xerox	
Teletype			
Texas Instruments	serial matrix, inkjet, low-end laser, airline ticketing	printer business acquired by GENICOM	
Toshiba			
Trilog	color serial matrix printers	acquired by Centronics	
TVS Electronics	dot matrix printers		

== U ==
Name / Products / Status / References; UBIX Corp. / Konica Minolta, Bizhub, brother, / acquired by UBIX Corporation

== V ==
Name / Products / Status / References; Versatec / electrostatic plotter / acquired by Xerox

== X ==
Name	Products	Status	References
Xeikon	High speed continuous forms printers		
Xerox	Xerographic (Laser) Printers - Office through Production Color, High Speed Aqueous Inkjet presses, Solid Ink Inkjet presses, etc.		
Xerox International Partners (Fuji Xerox)			

xanté

== W ==
Name / Products / Status / References; Wipro Technologies

== Z ==
Name / Products / Status / References; Zebra / Label, Mobile, Card and Kiosk Printers. Thermal, Thermal Transfer and Retransfer technologies.
