= General Electric Specialty Control Plant =

Historic factory complex in Waynesboro, Virginia

- U.S. National Register of Historic Places
- Virginia Landmarks Register
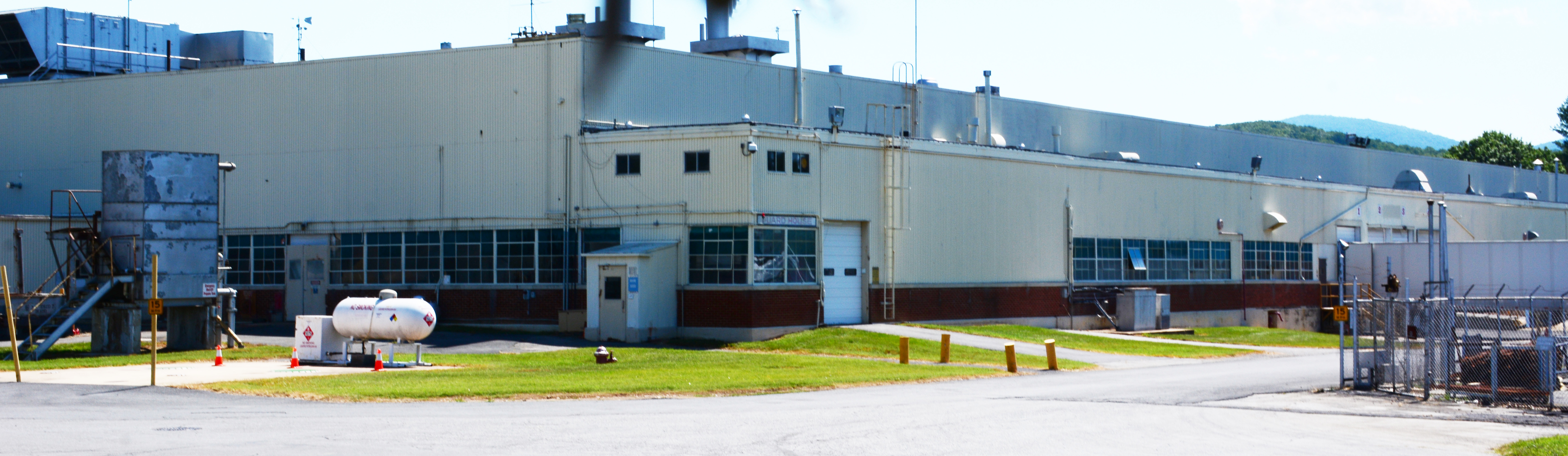

- Location within Virginia Location within the United States
- Location: 1 Solutions Way, Waynesboro, Virginia
- Coordinates: 38.090934°N 78.869712°W
- Area: 25.5 acres (10.3 ha)
- Built: 1927, 1953, 1960, 1969
- Built by: J. A. Jones Construction Company
- Architects: Whitman, Requardt & Associates
- NRHP reference No.: 12000180
- VLR No.: 136-5055

Significant dates
- Added to NRHP: March 29, 2012
- Designated VLR: December 15, 2011

General Electric Specialty Control Plant is a historic factory complex situated on a 115 acres (47 ha) industrial campus in Waynesboro, Virginia, of which 25.5 acres (10.3 ha) is listed as a historic district. The property, a former airport, was acquired by General Electric (GE) in 1953 as one of roughly 120 individual operating departments created during the company's decentralization effort. The Specialty Control Plant developed technologies in areas ranging from military products and space travel to computing, including the TermiNet line of computer printer terminals, and played a notable role in business opposition to Virginia's massive resistance to school desegregation in 1958.

The facility was sold to GENICOM on October 21, 1983. After GENICOM entered bankruptcy in 2000, the property was acquired by the newly formed Solutions Way Management, which leases much of the complex for light manufacturing, warehousing, and distribution.

The complex was listed on the National Register of Historic Places on March 29, 2012.

== Background ==
In the early 1950s, General Electric was a highly centralized operation with six major manufacturing works located in Schenectady, New York; Pittsfield, Massachusetts; Lynn, Massachusetts; Philadelphia, Pennsylvania; Erie, Pennsylvania; and Fort Wayne, Indiana. At that time, under Ralph J. Cordiner's presidency, a major decentralization occurred in which larger business groups were divided into individual operating departments, with new plants built in locations across the country.

The previous Industrial Control Division, located in Schenectady, New York, was subdivided into four such departments:

- The Industry Control Department, which built control systems for large industry such as cranes, steel, paper, and marine and submarine panels, was located in Salem, Virginia.
- The General Purpose Control Department, which built smaller control components such as relays and contactors for general industrial applications, was located in Bloomington, Illinois.
- The Appliance Control Department, which built control systems for the company's consumer products (such as refrigerators, oil burners, and small switching devices), was located in Morrison, Illinois.

Each of those three departments had a common product line sufficient for viable operation as a separate entity, whereas the Specialty Control Department came to Waynesboro with the remaining heterogeneous components of the original Control Division, none of which could survive independently.

== History ==
=== Valley Airport ===
Before industrial development, the property served as Waynesboro's first airfield, Valley Airport, opened in 1927 by local aviation pioneer C. C. "Rip" Loth just north of town. Operating as a commercial grass airfield just west of the Norfolk and Western Railway, the field featured two unpaved runways arranged in an L-shape and several hangars, including a cement-block hangar built in 1927 that remains standing on the property as a contributing structure to the historic district. Valley Airport operated until 1953, when it closed and the land was sold to General Electric for industrial redevelopment.

=== 1950s ===
In 1953, GE purchased the closed Valley Airport, consisting of an initial 75 acres (30 ha) parcel located just west of the Norfolk and Western Railway (the complex would later expand to 115 acres (47 ha)). Construction of the new plant to house the Specialty Control Department began soon after, and by the summer of 1954 production of photoelectric devices had begun following the relocation of supervisory personnel from Schenectady.

At its peak, the plant produced an extensive and varied range of products, including numerical control systems, photoelectric devices, hot-box detectors, regulators and static exciters, relays, automation systems, nuclear-derived thickness gauges, and automotive and aerospace control systems. The plant also supplied components for NASA's Apollo program.

In 1958, a political crisis occurred when U.S. Senator Harry F. Byrd Sr., who led Virginia's dominant political organization, spearheaded a policy of massive resistance to school desegregation, resulting in the closure of several public school districts in Virginia. With roughly 10,000 children locked out of public schools, private segregation academies began to form. GE management felt the issue required a response and empowered Specialty Control management to speak out. Dr. Louis T. Rader, general manager of the Specialty Control Department, delivered speeches—primarily in Northern Virginia—representing GE's Virginia plants and warning that Fortune 500 companies would not continue to operate or expand in the state if its school-closure policy remained in place. The policy was overturned and rescinded in early 1959, in part due to business opposition from companies such as GE.

=== 1960s and 1970s ===
In the late 1960s, the plant introduced the TermiNet product line—computer printer terminals that used solid-state technology and printed circuit boards, offering an alternative in a data-communications market then dominated by Teletype. The TermiNet 300 was an early dot matrix printer that found immediate use as a stock ticker printer.

Beginning in the late 1970s, the Specialty Control Plant began downsizing as product lines were transferred elsewhere, leaving the facility primarily focused on TermiNet printers and relays.

=== 1980s and 1990s ===
In 1983, a new company, GENICOM, was formed to purchase the Waynesboro operation. The venture found initial success, and its stock went public in 1987. In 1995, GENICOM established its Enterprising Service Solutions Company (ESSC) division at the Waynesboro site. During the late 1990s, impact printer technology was overtaken by laser printers, and GENICOM filed for bankruptcy in 2000. It reformed as GENICOM LLC, then in 2003 merged into TallyGenicom. In 2009, the company went bankrupt and its intellectual property was acquired by Printronix.

=== 2000s ===
Following GENICOM's 2000 bankruptcy, Solutions Way Management was formed to acquire and manage the Waynesboro real estate complex, while ESSC continued service and support operations at the site. ESSC's operations were later acquired by Northrop Grumman, which continued to service existing impact printers, while Solutions Way Management—following a 2008 renovation completed to historic preservation standards—expanded multi-tenant leasing of the complex for warehousing, shipping, and light manufacturing that operates as Solutions Place.

== Access road ==
The main entrance road connecting the complex to Hopeman Parkway has been renamed three times to reflect changes in ownership and operations:

- General Electric Drive (1953–1983): Constructed as the original industrial access road when General Electric developed the former Valley Airport site for the Specialty Control Department.
- Genicom Drive (1983–1995): Renamed following the October 1983 sale of the facility to GENICOM, giving the plant the street address 1 Genicom Drive.
- Solutions Way (1995–present): Renamed following the 1995 establishment of GENICOM's Enterprising Service Solutions Company (ESSC) division, giving the complex its current address of 1 Solutions Way.

== Architecture ==
Designed by the engineering firm Whitman, Requardt & Associates and built by the J. A. Jones Construction Company, the General Electric Specialty Control Plant exemplifies mid-20th-century industrial Modernist design. Set on a landscaped industrial campus west of the Norfolk and Western Railway, the 25.5 acres (10.3 ha) historic district encompasses the primary factory complex along with several contributing structures:

- Main Factory Building (1953–1955, expanded 1960 and 1969): The centerpiece of the complex is a sprawling, low-slung, steel-frame building clad in red brick, corrugated metal siding, and continuous bands of industrial steel-sash windows. Designed to maximize natural light, climate control, and flexible assembly-line layouts, the facility consists of a two-story front office and engineering wing connected to a large, single-story manufacturing floor at the rear. Major additions in 1960 and 1969 expanded the manufacturing and engineering capacity while maintaining the original Modernist horizontal lines.
- Valley Airport Hangar (1927): Located near the eastern edge of the campus, the surviving one-story cement-block airplane hangar built by C. C. "Rip" Loth is the oldest structure on the site and a surviving example of early commercial aviation in the Shenandoah Valley.
- Water Tower and Support Structures (1953–1955): An elevated steel water tank, boiler house, and electrical substation constructed alongside the original plant provided dedicated utilities and fire protection for the complex.

In 2008, the complex underwent a certified historic rehabilitation that preserved its exterior brick facades, steel-sash fenestration, and interior industrial framing while adapting the floor plan for multi-tenant light manufacturing and distribution.

== Environmental remediation ==
Decades of electronics manufacturing, electroplating, and metal finishing operations at the facility generated hazardous wastes—primarily volatile organic compounds (VOCs) such as trichloroethylene (TCE) and perchloroethylene (PCE), along with heavy metals—that contaminated soil and groundwater beneath the property. The site became subject to corrective action oversight under the Resource Conservation and Recovery Act (RCRA), with General Electric retaining environmental remediation responsibilities following the 1983 sale of the plant to GENICOM.

Environmental investigations identified several solid waste management units across the campus, including former surface impoundments, drum storage areas, and wastewater treatment facilities. Remediation measures implemented under the oversight of the United States Environmental Protection Agency (EPA) and the Virginia Department of Environmental Quality (VDEQ) included soil excavation, groundwater pump-and-treat systems, in-situ chemical oxidation, and long-term groundwater monitoring. In addition, institutional controls—including groundwater use restrictions and land-use covenants limiting the property to commercial and industrial uses—were established to prevent exposure to residual contamination.
