= Anelex =

Defunct American computer company

Anelex Corporation
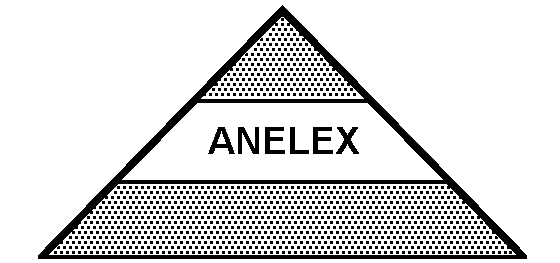
- Company type: Public
- Industry: Computer
- Founded: 1951; 74 years ago in Boston, Massachusetts
- Founder: E. Ross Anderson
- Defunct: October 1967; 57 years ago
- Fate: Acquired by Mohawk Data Sciences

Anelex Corporation (sometimes stylized ANelex) was an American computer hardware company active from 1952 to 1967 and based primarily in Boston, Massachusetts. It was founded by E. Ross Anderson (c. 1896–1968) and closely tied to Anderson-Nichols & Co., a manufacturing company based in Boston which Anderson had co-founded in 1922. Both were based out of the same building, with Anelex eventually absorbing Anderson-Nichols.

Anelex focused primarily on computer equipment, chiefly line printers and hard disk drives. For a time they were the second-largest manufacturer of computer printers in the world, second only to IBM. They were also reportedly the fourth ever company to manufacture hard disk drives. In 1967, they were acquired in whole by Mohawk Data Sciences.

== History ==
Anelex Corporation was founded in 1951 by E. Ross Anderson (c. 1896–1968), a business magistrate in Boston who had formerly co-founded Anderson-Nichols & Co., a diversified manufacturing concern, with Henry B. Nichols in 1922. Unlike Anderson-Nichols & Co., which was primarily focused on tool manufacturing, architectural engineering, and consulting, Anelex chiefly focused on selling its own computer equipment. The genesis of Anelex came when the United States federal government contracted Anderson-Nichols & Co. for a high-speed line printer. Anelex was then formed as a division of Anderson-Nichols, operating under the latter company for a year until it was spun off into a separate corporation in 1952. In 1960, Anelex went public, with Anderson-Nichols owning a 15-percent stake in the company until 1961. Both continued to be based out of the same building at 150 Causeway Street in Boston, which was demolished in late 1996. Shortly after their split from Anderson-Nichols, however, Anelex's administrative headquarters were relocated to Concord, New Hampshire. Anelex's floor space in Boston spanned nearly 2 acres (8,100 m^{2}).

Anelex's primary focus in the beginning of its existence was high-speed line printers for analog and digital mainframe computers. Its first trademarked product in this field was the Synchroprinter in June 1952, which had a printing speed of 15 lines of 40 characters per second. By 1962, Anelex was in their fifth generation of printer products, high-end models of which were capable of printing 2000 alphanumeric lines per minute. By the mid-1960s, they were the second-largest manufacturer of computer printers in the world, behind only IBM. The company acted as an OEM, supplying printers to 33 other computer companies across the globe in 1962.

Anelex's steady expansion was helped along by several key expansions and acquisitions in the early 1960s. This included establishing a branch office in Minneapolis, Minnesota, in 1962; acquiring Franklin Electronics Corporation of Bridgeport, Pennsylvania—a start-up maker of high-speed line printers—in 1963; and acquiring the Unicraft Corporation of Newport, New Hampshire—a maker of precision instruments—in 1964. Anelex briefly manufactured single-purpose computers for military use in 1962 but had abandoned this field within a couple years.

In late 1963, the company announced its first hard disk drive products, to be plug compatible with IBM's concurrent offerings. The initial trio of Anelex's disk drives included the Model 80, a six-platter disk pack system capable of storing 3.9 million characters of information; the Model 800, an eight-platter, non-disk-pack (non-interchangeable) system—four heads per platter—capable of storing up to 23 million characters; and the 4800, a multi-disk-pack system accommodating up to four eight-platter packs (24 platters total), capable of storing up to 95 million characters. Anelex delivered the first units of their disk drives by July 1964. They were reportedly the fourth ever company to manufacture hard disk drives, after IBM (the inventors of the HDD), Bryant Computer Products, and Data Products.

Between August and October 1967, Anelex was acquired by Mohawk Data Sciences in a stock swap.
