= GENICOM =

American printer manufacturer (1982–2003)

GENICOM Corporation
- Type: Public (until 2000); Private (2000–2003)
- Industry: Computer printers
- Predecessor: General Electric (Data Communication Products Division)
- Founded: 1982
- Defunct: August 2003
- Fate: Merged with Tally
- Successor: TallyGenicom
- Headquarters: Waynesboro, Virginia, U.S. (1982–1990s); Chantilly, Virginia, U.S. (1990s–2003)
- Key people: Louis T. Rader (GM); Paul Winn (CEO); Shaun Donnellan (CEO); Art Gallo (VP)
- Products: Dot matrix, band, laser, thermal, and specialty ticket printers
- Owner: Sun Capital Partners (2000–2003)

GENICOM Corporation was an American manufacturer of computer printers, headquartered in Chantilly, Virginia. Spun off from General Electric in 1982, the company produced impact, laser, and specialty enterprise printers before merging with Tally in 2003 to form TallyGenicom.

== History ==
=== Origins at General Electric (1954–1982) ===
In 1954, General Electric (GE) decentralized its operations into separate business units. After reorganizing its motors and controls groups, several remaining product lines were consolidated into the newly formed Specialty Control Department.

GE invested $3.5 million to purchase 75 acres (300,000 m^{2}) on the site of the original 1927 airport in Waynesboro, Virginia, constructing a dedicated manufacturing plant led by General Manager Dr. Louis T. Rader. Approximately 145 managers, engineers, and their families relocated from Schenectady, New York, to establish the facility, and roughly 400 local residents were hired during its first year of operation. The General Electric Specialty Control Plant was later added to the National Register of Historic Places in 2012.

=== History ===
In 1982, GE divested its printer and relays groups, which were formally incorporated as GENICOM Corporation in 1983. In the early 1990s, GENICOM relocated its corporate headquarters from Waynesboro to Chantilly, Virginia, while also leasing engineering offices in Calabasas, California, to develop a 400 dots per inch monochrome laser printer.

Throughout the late 1980s and 1990s, GENICOM expanded its product portfolio through a series of strategic acquisitions:

- Centronics (1987): Acquired the printer business assets of Centronics—including legacy product lines from Computer Peripherals Inc and Trilog—adding the 350 series of dot matrix printers and the LineWriter series of band printers.
- Rastek Corporation (1988): Acquired the Huntsville, Alabama-based manufacturer of laser printer controllers and high-resolution display electronics to bolster its non-impact printer development.
- Printer Systems Corporation (1995): Announced the January 1995 acquisition of Printer Systems Corporation (PSC), a developer of IBM interfaces based in Gaithersburg, Maryland. PSC President Art Gallo joined GENICOM as a vice president, and PSC became GENICOM's laser development group, producing printers built on Lexmark and Kentek engines.
- Texas Instruments (1996): Purchased TI's printer business, adding specialized airline-ticket, boarding-pass, and baggage-tag printers to its catalog.
- Digital Equipment Corporation (1997): Acquired DEC's printer division in August 1997 for $27 million, initially manufacturing hardware under both the GENICOM and Digital brands. Following Compaq's acquisition of Digital in February 1998, new units were produced under the Compaq brand.
- SRS Imaging: Acquired imaging technology assets from SRS Imaging to support its non-impact printer development.

== GENICOM products and OEM partnerships ==
Following its spin-off from General Electric in October 1983, GENICOM expanded the Waynesboro plant's legacy TermiNet product line into a broad portfolio of enterprise impact, line, and non-impact printers sold both under the GENICOM brand and through major original equipment manufacturer (OEM) agreements.

=== Impact and line printers ===
At Waynesboro, GENICOM continued manufacturing and refining heavy-duty serial dot-matrix and teleprinter terminals—including the TermiNet series, the 3000 and 4000 series high-speed dot-matrix printers, and the 4400 shuttle-matrix line printers—designed for continuous-duty data processing, banking, and industrial bar-code printing. To serve automotive and industrial manufacturing supply chains, Waynesboro engineers integrated native industrial graphics and bar-code languages—specificallyQMS Magnum graphics and Automotive Industry Action Group (AIAG) shipping-label specifications—directly into the printer firmware. In 1987, GENICOM significantly expanded its high-speed line-printer business by acquiring the printer division of Centronics Data Computer Corporation, integrating Centronics' band and line-matrix printer technologies into its product lineup.

=== IBM host connectivity ===
A major specialty of GENICOM's Waynesboro engineering group was direct host-attachment hardware and protocol emulation for IBM mainframe and midrange environments. GENICOM offered factory-installed coaxial (IBM 3270) and twinaxial (IBM 5250 / System/36, System/38, and AS/400) interfaces supporting IBM SNA Character String (SCS) and Intelligent Printer Data Stream (IPDS) protocols, allowing Waynesboro impact and laser printers to replace higher-cost IBM-branded host printers without external protocol converters.

=== Non-impact printers and OEM sourcing ===
To compete in the rapidly growing non-impact office printing market without bearing the capital cost of developing its own electrophotographic print engines, GENICOM sourced laser and ion-deposition print engines from external manufacturers and integrated its own controller electronics, firmware, and emulations at Waynesboro. Key OEM engine suppliers included:

- Brother
- Canon: Supplied laser print engines (including the LBP-CX and LBP-SX series) used in GENICOM's desktop and departmental laser printers including the 5010 and the AceWriter 6000.
- Fuji Xerox
- Hitachi
- Kentek
- Minolta QMS
- Samsung
- Toshiba

=== Private-label OEM supply ===
Alongside direct and dealer sales, GENICOM operated as a major OEM supplier to minicomputer and mainframe vendors, shipping customized printers badged under partner brands. Major OEM customers included Digital Equipment Corporation (DEC), IBM, Wang Laboratories, Unisys, and Hewlett-Packard, for whom the Waynesboro facility produced tailored firmware, interface boards, and cabinetry.

=== Relays ===
From its opening in 1954 through the late 20th century, the Waynesboro facility was a major manufacturer of high-reliability, hermetically sealed miniature and subminiature relays designed for extreme vibration, shock, and temperature environments. Unlike general-purpose industrial relays produced at General Electric's Bloomington, Illinois, plant, the Specialty Control Department focused on precision, low-level switching devices—including crystal-can, half-size crystal-can, and TO-5–style relays—engineered for military avionics, missile guidance, communications equipment, and spacecraft.

Because microscopic dust or moisture inside a sealed relay enclosure could cause contact failure in flight or orbit, assembly required ultra-clean manufacturing conditions. The Waynesboro plant constructed specialized, positive-pressure cleanrooms where workers wore lint-free garments and assembled microscopic armatures, coils, and gold-plated contacts under magnification before sealing the metal enclosures in an inert-gas atmosphere. Relays manufactured in Waynesboro were supplied for U.S. defense systems and spaceflight programs, including NASA's Apollo program.

Following the 1983 sale of the plant to Genicom Corporation, relay manufacturing continued alongside the TermiNet printer business as one of the facility's two core product lines. Genicom later divested its relay division in the 1990s to Communications Instruments, Inc. (CII Technologies), which was subsequently acquired by Tyco Electronics (now TE Connectivity).

=== Manufacturing shift to Mexico and Datacom restructuring (1990s–2001) ===
When GENICOM spun off from General Electric's Data Communication Products Business Department in 1982–1983, it inherited both the primary manufacturing complex in Waynesboro, Virginia, and a cross-border maquiladora assembly operation in Reynosa, Tamaulipas, Mexico, operated through its subsidiary Datacom de México, S.A. de C.V. alongside support facilities in McAllen, Texas. During the mid-to-late 1990s, as impact printer demand declined and GENICOM sought lower production costs, the company gradually shifted manufacturing lines from Waynesboro to Datacom de México in Reynosa.

During GENICOM's 2000 Chapter 11 bankruptcy proceedings, manufacturing at the Waynesboro complex ceased and the historic plant was sold to Solutions Way Management for warehousing and distribution, while the cross-border Datacom manufacturing operation was separated from the core assets acquired by Sun Capital Partners and Art Gallo. In November 2001, the Datacom operation was reacquired under Sun Capital Partners and organized as an affiliated sister company, Datacom Manufacturing LP, reuniting GENICOM's engineering and sales organization with its Reynosa and McAllen manufacturing facilities prior to the 2003 merger with Tally.

=== Enterprising Service Solutions Company (ESSC) ===
Alongside its hardware manufacturing operations, GENICOM operated a dedicated enterprise IT services and maintenance business group known as Enterprising Service Solutions Company (ESSC). Formed during the mid-1990s through the integration of acquired maintenance operations, ESSC expanded GENICOM beyond printer manufacturing into multi-vendor enterprise support and network integration.

ESSC delivered both traditional hardware maintenance and midrange client/server IT services across North America, including:

- Multi-vendor field and depot repair: On-site maintenance and depot repair for printers, midrange computers, and peripheral hardware manufactured by GENICOM as well as third-party vendors such as Digital Equipment Corporation and Compaq.
- Network integration and internetworking: Design, deployment, and support of enterprise local- and wide-area networks, including achieving Cisco Systems Silver Certification in Canada in June 2000.
- Managed support services: Outsourced help desk operations, asset management, and IT consulting for commercial and government clients, including U.S. Department of Defense facilities.

To support ESSC's depot repair logistics, GENICOM opened a 320,000-square-foot (30,000 m^{2}) centralized repair facility in Louisville, Kentucky, in 1997, transferring repair operations from Waynesboro, Virginia. However, declining Digital/Compaq service contract volumes, inventory write-downs, and high operating costs at the Louisville center contributed to operating losses in 1999. Following GENICOM's March 2000 Chapter 11 bankruptcy filing, the Louisville repair facility was closed in April 2000 as the company refocused on its core printer manufacturing business.

=== Delisting and bankruptcy (2000–2002) ===
Following a $74.8 million net loss in 1999 driven by declining Digital/Compaq service revenue, inventory write-downs, and cost overruns from its Oracle database migration, GENICOM's stock fell below $1 per share and was delisted from the NASDAQ in January 2000. Burdened by approximately $153 million in debt owed to a lending syndicate led by Bank of America, GENICOM relieved CEO Paul Winn and Chief Financial Officer James Gale of their duties in early March 2000 and appointed turnaround executive Shaun Donnellan as CEO. On March 10, 2000, the company filed for Chapter 11 bankruptcy protection in the United States Bankruptcy Court for the District of Delaware. Concurrently, GENICOM suffered severe cost overruns while migrating its legacy ASK/CA MANMAN database to Oracle; originally budgeted at $6 million, the project escalated to $20 million by 1999.

During bankruptcy proceedings, GENICOM liquidated non-core divisions and resolved outstanding litigation to satisfy creditors:

- Sold its Canadian operations (including ESSC Canada) for $6.22 million.
- Divested its airline-ticket and baggage-tag printer business to French peripherals manufacturer IER for $3.5 million.
- Paid $12.6 million to settle an ongoing contract and intellectual-property lawsuit with Compaq.
- Separated its European sales and distribution operations into an independent entity, GENICOM International.
- Closed ESSC operations and outsourced service to Northrop Grumman and then Pitney Bowes].
- During this restructuring period, GENICOM also sold its relays group to CII Technologies (later acquired by Tyco International), which relocated those operations to North Carolina.

In August 2000, private equity firm Sun Capital Partners and former GENICOM vice president Art Gallo acquired GENICOM's remaining core North American printer assets—operating as GENICOM, LLC with facilities in Chantilly, Waynesboro, and McAllen, Texas—with Gallo serving as president and CEO. Under Sun Capital Partners' ownership, the company continued to release new commercial printing hardware—including the Intellipress digital color printing system in June 2001 and the microLaser mL450 in May 2002—while implementing additional workforce reductions in September 2001 amid an industry-wide slowdown in IT spending.

In November 2001, the cross-border Datacom manufacturing operation (comprising Datacom de México in Reynosa and support operations in McAllen) was separately acquired under Sun Capital Partners and organized as an affiliated sister company, Datacom Manufacturing LP, reuniting GENICOM's engineering and sales organization with its primary printer assembly plants prior to the 2003 merger with Tally.

=== Merger into TallyGenicom (2003) ===
In 2003, GENICOM and Tally merged to form TallyGenicom (TG).
