= Erwin Tomash =

American engineer

Erwin Tomash (November 17, 1921 – December 10, 2012) was an American engineer who co-founded Dataproducts Corporation, which specialized in computer technology, specifically printers and core memory units. He is recognized for his early pioneering work with computer equipment peripherals. Tomash led the creation of the Charles Babbage Institute and is responsible for The Adelle and Erwin Tomash Fellowship in the History of Information Technology and The Erwin Tomash Library. He died at age 91 in his home in Soquel, California due to complications from Alzheimer's disease.

== Education ==
Born and raised in Saint Paul, Minnesota, Erwin Tomash graduated from the University of Minnesota with his electrical engineering degree in 1943.

== Early life ==
Upon graduating from the University of Minnesota, Tomash joined the U.S. Army Signal Corps, where he worked with radar, and was awarded the Bronze Star for his wartime activities. Following his time with the Army Signal Corps, Tomash served at the Naval Ordnance Laboratory briefly, before joining the Engineering Research Associates. As a research associate, he worked on developing electronic computers, including the ERA 1103 or UNIVAC Scientific. In 1956, he joined Telemeter Magnetic in Los Angeles where he became the company's president. He then oversaw Telemeter Magnetics' design of core memories for computers and in 1962 left Telemeter Magnetic, and co-founded Dataproducts Corporation.

== Dataproducts Corporation ==
Dataproducts Corporation was co-founded by Erwin Tomash in 1962, and specialized in computer peripherals, with a focus on printers. In 1966, core memory was added to the product line, and due to its resulting expansion, the company relocated to Woodland Hills, Los Angeles, California in 1968. The company acquired Staff Dynamics, a personnel agency, and Uptime, a manufacturer of card readers; it also served as an incubator for Informatics, an early software company. By 1970 the company had become the world's leading independent printer manufacturer. In 1980 Tomash retired and Graham Tyson, already chief operating officer and president, succeeded him as chairman.

== Awards/Accomplishments ==
In 1987 Erwin Tomash was honored by the IEEE Computer Society, and received the Computer Entrepreneur Award in recognition of his early pioneering work with computer peripherals.

Erwin and his wife Adelle Tomash were instrumental in establishing the Charles Babbage Institute, which honorably named a highly regarded library, archives, and a fellowship program after them, as well as the CBI Tomash computer history reprint series.

Erwin and Adelle Tomash, as well as the Tomash Family Foundation, were recognized in a 2009-2010 philanthropy report by the University of California, Santa Cruz (UCSC) as having contributed a gift of $1,000 or more to specific programs at the university.

=== The Erwin Tomash Library ===
The Erwin Tomash Library on The History of Computing is an annotated and illustrated catalog documenting a collection of books and manuscripts related to the history of computing. It was assembled, over the course of many years, by Erwin Tomash using his knowledge as a pioneer in the development of computers. The collection consists of over five thousand items from twelfth century manuscripts to modern publications, and documents the rarest items together with a series of essays that explain the uses of little known instruments and techniques that are discussed in the entries. Each entry consists of the bibliographic details, some biographical information on the author, a description of the contents, and illustrations of interesting pages and diagrams. The library catalog, almost 1600 pages long, can be found on the IEEE Computer Society website as well as the CBI website. A portion of the Erwin Tomash Library (post-1954 volumes) was donated to CBI and is publicly accessible there at the University of Minnesota.

The contents of the Erwin Tomash library were sold at auction by Sotheby's in London in September 2018. The copy of Galileo's Difesa contro alle Calunnie et Imposture di Baldessar Capra Milanese (1607), with a handwritten inscription by Galileo, sold for £466,000 (US$616,378).

=== The Tomash Fellowship ===
The Adelle and Erwin Tomash Fellowship in the History of Information Technology is awarded to a graduate student for doctoral dissertation research in the history of computing. The fellowship is to be held at the recipient's home academic institution, the Charles Babbage Institute, or any other location with appropriate research facilities. It is intended for students who have completed all requirements for the doctoral degree except the research and writing of the dissertation.
