= MDS 2400 =

Early electrical communications computer

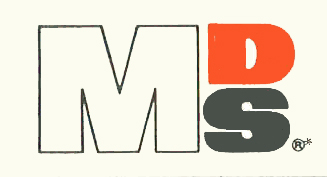
Mohawk Data Sciences Corporation

The MDS 2400 was a small floor-standing computer manufactured by Mohawk Data Sciences Corporation. The machine was originally developed by Atron Corporation as the Atron 501 Datamanager, introduced in 1969. It was marketed primarily for remote job entry applications and promoted as The Peripheral Processor.

Two related models from Mohawk were the 1200 and the 2300.

== Description ==
The system had a base memory of 4 KB of core memory with a 2 μs cycle time, expandable to 32 KB. It supported one to four input/output channels with up to 16 devices per channel. It offered a choice of line printers between 280 and 1250 lines per minute (lpm), a 400 cards per minute (cpm) card reader, a 160 columns per second card punch, a paper tape reader, a 2.48 MB disk storage unit, and 7 and 9-track half-inch magnetic tape drives. An optional asynchronous terminal could be attached as a console.

The system supported synchronous communications at up to 9600 baud, and usually served as a remote job entry system to a larger mainframe computer. The remote job entry software provided full support for the HASP multi-leaving protocol, among others.

== See also ==
- George Cogar
