= George Cogar =

American computer scientist and engineer (born 1932 - disappeared 1983)

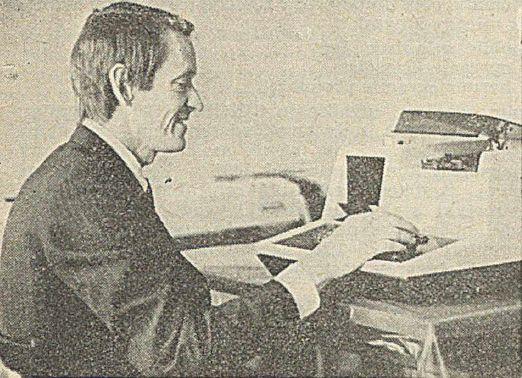
- Cogar in 1973
- Born: George R. Cogar; 1932 (age 92–93); Gassaway, West Virginia, U.S.
- Disappeared: September 2, 1983 (aged 50–51); British Columbia, Canada
- Status: Missing for 42 years, 8 months and 9 days
- Spouse: Ann Cogar

George R. Cogar (1932 – disappeared September 2, 1983) was an American computer scientist and engineer. He disappeared in 1983 while on a private plane flying over western Canada; no wreckage has ever been found.

== Professional career ==
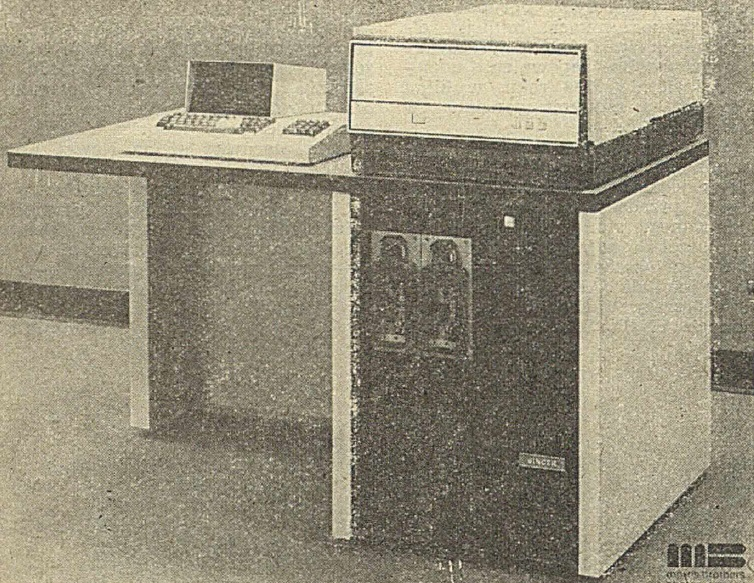
A Singer System 1500 computer

Cogar was the head of the UNIVAC 1004 electronic design team code named the "bumblebee project", and later the "barn project", and co-founder of Mohawk Data Sciences Corporation, a Herkimer, New York-based multimillion-dollar business. His most successful invention was the Data Recorder magnetic tape encoder, which was introduced in 1965 and eliminated the need for keypunches and punched cards by direct encoding on tape. He also founded the Cogar Corporation, where he built an intelligent terminal—an early forerunner of the modern personal computer—which he called the Cogar System 4 or Cogar 4. The Cogar 4 became the Singer 1500 after Singer Business Machines acquired Cogar Corporation. In 1976, International Computers Limited (ICL) acquired Singer Business Machines, changing the name of the computer to the ICL 1500.

== Disappearance ==
Cogar was last seen Friday, September 2, 1983, when a private plane, a Britten-Norman Islander, went down somewhere in British Columbia, Canada.

== Philanthropy ==
Cogar and his wife Ann established the Cogar Foundation for the express purpose of awarding grants and scholarships to students of Herkimer County. The Cogar Gallery at Herkimer County Community College is named for them.

== Patents ==
- US 3166715 Asynchronous self controlled shift register
- US 3261003 Tape error indication apparatus
- US 3510680 Asynchronous shift register with data control gating therefor
- US 3550103 Reverse write and forward verify read of a variable length data
- US 3794980 Apparatus and method for controlling sequential execution of instructions and nesting of subroutines in a data processor
- US 4365742 Heating system
- US 4609613 Permanent reproductions and formation method therefor
- US 3410312 Fluid shift flip-flop
- US 3188621 Display panels with selectable indicators
- US 3239809 Skew correction buffer
- US 3426415 Printed circuit assembly
- US 3283255 Phase modulation system for reading particular information
- US 3282205 Print control means for high speed printer with traveling print bar
- US 3310660 Asynchronous counting devices
- US 3483523 Data recording and verifying machine
- US 3807614 Backspace mechanism for a tape handling apparatus for a data recorder
- US 3193697 Synchronized single pulser
- US 3585619 Magnetic tape readout system with means to generate artificial signals
- US 3578257 Tape handling apparatus for data recorder
- US 3555306 Keyboard sprocket circuit
- US 3624838 Address counter stage circuitry

== See also ==
- List of people who disappeared
- MDS 2400
- List of missing aircraft
- Mohawk Data Sciences
