= Trilog =

American computer printer manufacturer (1978–1985)

Trilog, Inc.
- Type: Private (1978–1985); Subsidiary of Centronics (1985–1987)
- Industry: Computer hardware, computer printers
- Founded: 1978 in Irvine, California, U.S.
- Defunct: 1985 (acquired by Centronics)
- Headquarters: Irvine, California, United States
- Products: Colorplot series, T-100 / T-1100A, TIP (Trilog Impact Printer) series, HC4027 interface
- Parent: Centronics (1985–1987)

Trilog, Inc. was an American computer peripheral manufacturer founded in 1978 and headquartered in Irvine, California. The company developed and manufactured color impact line matrix printers and raster graphics plotters for minicomputer and mainframe environments until its acquisition by Centronics in January 1985.

== History ==
Trilog, Inc. was established in Irvine, California, in 1978 to supply wide-format, plain-paper color graphics output for institutional and enterprise computing environments, such as Digital Equipment Corporation (DEC) VAX and IBM mainframe installations. During the late 1970s, organizations requiring color charts, CAD/CAM drawings, or scientific visualizations generally relied on pen plotters that required specialized cut-sheet media or drafting film. Trilog developed impact line-matrix systems capable of producing both alphanumeric text and multi-color raster graphics on continuous fanfold paper.

In 1984, Centronics—one of the major printer manufacturers of the era—entered into an agreement to market Trilog's color matrix printer line. On January 17, 1985, Centronics acquired Trilog outright, integrating Trilog's engineering operations, patent portfolio, and product catalog into its commercial printer division.

== Technology ==
Trilog's systems combined horizontal hammer-bank line-matrix mechanics with multi-pass color ribbon transport and precision bidirectional paper handling.

- Hammer-bank line-matrix printing: Rather than moving a single multi-pin printhead back and forth across a carriage, Trilog printers utilized a wide horizontal shuttle bar fitted with an array of spring-loaded print hammers. The shuttle vibrated laterally at high frequency, enabling simultaneous dot impact across a full 132-column page width.
- Three-color ribbon overprinting: To generate color output, Trilog employed a wide continuous-loop nylon ribbon divided into three longitudinal color bands: yellow, magenta, and cyan. During graphics mode, the printer executed a raster pass for a single color band, shifted the ribbon vertically to align the subsequent color band, and overprinted the page. By overlapping cyan, magenta, and yellow dots, the hardware produced secondary colors (red, green, and blue) as well as composite black and halftone shading.
- Bidirectional tractor feed: Multi-pass color registration required mechanical alignment between passes. Trilog engineered dual stepper motor tractor feeds positioned above and below the print station to reverse continuous fanfold forms without paper skew or jamming.

== Products ==
=== Colorplot Series ===
The Colorplot family (including the C-60, C-100, and C-144, named for their respective horizontal resolutions of 60, 100, and 144 dots per inch) was Trilog's flagship graphics-oriented line. Marketed as "The Plain Paper Multicolor Plotter," the Colorplot 100 (Model C-100) was positioned as a lower-cost, chemical-free alternative to electrostatic and inkjet plotters, operating at roughly 0.5 cents per copy on standard fanfold paper compared to 2.0 cents or more for sensitized electrostatic paper.

Key technical specifications for the Colorplot 100 included:

- Resolution & Dot Geometry: 100 × 100 dpi (horizontal and vertical) using a 0.020-inch (0.51 mm) dot diameter across a 13.2-inch (335 mm) plotting width (1,320 horizontal plot points), with bidirectional registration accuracy within 0.005 inches (0.13 mm).
- Plotting Speed: 15 inches per minute (0.25 inches per second; 6.35 mm/s), averaging approximately 45 seconds per 11-inch (280 mm) single-color form and 3 minutes per 11-inch (280 mm) full-color plot. Asynchronous color plotting allowed colors to be imaged in any order without pre-sorting input data.
- Text Printing & Character Sets: 150 lines per minute (LPM) in standard 7 × 9 dot-matrix mode (or 7 × 12 for lowercase descenders) and 250 LPM in high-speed 7 × 7 (or 7 × 6) mode, selectable via hardware switch or software control codes (Ctrl-N). It supported a 132-column format at 6 or 8 lines per inch (LPI), a standard 96-character ASCII set, and double-height characters.
- Paper Handling & Consumables: Accommodated 1- to 6-part edge-punched fanfold forms from 4 to 16 inches (100 to 410 mm) wide (with a 6-inch-per-second [150 mm/s] paper slew rate and 46 ms 1/6-inch line step) via upper and lower adjustable tractors. It used 1-inch-wide (25 mm) by 60-yard-long (55 m) nylon ribbons, either in solid black or a three-band tricolor configuration (20 yards [18 m] per color).
- Interfaces & Physical Specifications: Standard Centronics and Dataproducts parallel interfaces with a full-line buffer, plus optional Versatec compatibility and RS-232C serial interfaces. The unit measured 41.0 × 30.0 × 24.3 inches (104 × 76 × 62 cm) with its pedestal, weighed 210 lb (95 kg), and consumed 450 W nominal (800 W peak).

To connect Colorplot printers directly to Tektronix 4027 color graphics terminals without host computer intervention, Trilog also marketed the HC4027 hard-copy controller interface.

=== T-100 and T-1100A Monochrome Printer/Plotters ===
Alongside the multicolor Colorplot 100, Trilog produced dedicated monochrome plain-paper impact printer/plotters sharing the same 100 × 100 dpi hammer-bank mechanism, 15-inch-per-minute (6.35 mm/s) plot rate, and 150/250 LPM dual-speed text architecture in a 185 lb (84 kg) quietized cabinet (rated below 65 dBA):

- T-100: Engineered as a plug- and software-compatible replacement for conventional line printers, featuring Centronics and Dataproducts parallel interfaces.
- T-1100A: Configured as a software- and plug-compatible alternative to Xerox Versatec electrostatic printer/plotters, eliminating liquid toners and "toner bar" artifacts during intermittent operation.

=== TIP Series ===
The TIP (Trilog Impact Printer) series—comprising models such as the single-hammer-bank TIP-150 (150 LPM) and dual-hammer-bank TIP-300 (300 LPM)—represented Trilog's in-house mechanical designs aimed at higher-speed enterprise data processing. On the TIP-300, two independent print-hammer arrays operated in tandem: in standard draft text mode, both banks fired simultaneously to achieve 300 LPM throughput, while in high-resolution graphics or near letter-quality (NLQ) text modes, the banks interleaved dots to increase vertical and horizontal dot density.
