= Centronics =

Former American computer printer manufacturer

Centronics Data Computer Corporation
- Type: Public
- Traded as: NYSE: CEN
- Industry: Computer hardware
- Predecessor: Wang Laboratories (division)
- Founded: 1971
- Founder: Robert Howard, Samuel Lang
- Defunct: 1987 (as a printer manufacturer)
- Fate: Printer division sold to GENICOM; remainder reorganized as Ekco Group, Inc.
- Successor: GENICOM (printer operations)
- Headquarters: Hudson, New Hampshire, U.S.
- Key people: Robert Howard (President and Chairman); Samuel Lang (Vice President); Max Hugel (Executive Vice President)
- Products: Computer printers (dot matrix, band, laser)
- Parent: Wang Laboratories (until 1971); Control Data Corporation (1982–1986)

Centronics Data Computer Corporation was an American manufacturer of computer printers based in Hudson, New Hampshire. Originally formed as a division of Wang Laboratories before being spun off in 1971, the company became a major supplier of dot matrix and band printers during the 1970s and early 1980s, providing original equipment manufacturer (OEM) units to companies such as Tandy and IBM.

Following manufacturing setbacks in 1980 and heavy financial losses, Control Data Corporation acquired a controlling interest in 1982. In 1987, Centronics sold its printer business to GENICOM for $87 million and subsequently pivoted into consumer housewares as Ekco Group, Inc. Today, the company is primarily remembered for the parallel interface standard and Centronics connector that bear its name.

== History ==
=== Foundations and early growth ===
Centronics began as a division of Wang Laboratories, founded and initially operated by Robert Howard (president) and Samuel Lang (vice president and owner of the K & L Color Photo Service Lab in New York City). Working alongside Wang founder An Wang, the group originally developed computerized remote terminals and anti-skimming systems for the casino industry, designing printers to generate receipts and transaction reports. Wang spun off the business in 1971, and Centronics was incorporated in Hudson, New Hampshire, with Howard serving as president and chairman.

In May 1970, before the formal spin-off, the division introduced the Centronics Model 101 at the Spring Joint Computer Conference. Its print head utilized a seven-wire solenoid impact system; based on this architecture, Centronics developed one of the earliest commercial dot matrix impact printers (following the OKI Wiredot in 1968).

To scale manufacturing reliably, Howard partnered with his neighbor, Max Hugel, founder and president of Brother International—the U.S. subsidiary of Brother Industries, then primarily a manufacturer of sewing machines and typewriters. Under their arrangement, print heads and electronics were produced at Centronics facilities in New Hampshire and Ireland, mechanical assemblies were manufactured in Japan by Brother, and final assembly took place in New Hampshire. This partnership helped establish Brother in the computer printer market, and Hugel later joined Centronics as executive vice president.

=== OEM partnerships ===
Throughout the 1970s and 1980s, Centronics relied heavily on original equipment manufacturer (OEM) agreements, supplying customized and rebadged printers to major minicomputer, mainframe, and microcomputer vendors:

- Tandy (RadioShack): In the late 1970s and early 1980s, Centronics built several printers marketed under the TRS-80 Line Printer and Quick Printer names:
  - TRS-80 Line Printer I: A rebadged Centronics 779, featuring a heavy-duty 5×7 dot-matrix mechanism (uppercase only) finished in silver to match the TRS-80 Model I.
  - TRS-80 Quick Printer: A rebadged Centronics Microprinter-P1; a compact electrostatic printer using 4.75 inches (121 mm) aluminum-coated paper instead of ink ribbons.
  - TRS-80 Line Printer II: Based on the Centronics 730, adding true lowercase descenders and support for friction-feed, roll, and pin-feed paper.
  - TRS-80 Line Printer III: A rebadged Centronics 704 wide-carriage (132-column) business printer.
  - TRS-80 Line Printer IV: Based on the Centronics 737, introducing high-density 9-pin proportional spacing for near-letter-quality text.
  - TRS-80 Line Printer VIII: Based on the Centronics 739, updating the Line Printer IV design with bit-image graphics support.
- IBM: Centronics manufactured a modified version of its PrintStation 350 serial matrix printer sold as the IBM 4214. In 1985, IBM 4214 contracts accounted for $65 million of Centronics' $126 million total revenue; when IBM ended production in 1986, Centronics' revenue fell sharply.
- Digital Equipment Corporation (DEC): Prior to introducing its own in-house LA30 and LA36 DECwriter terminals, DEC resold the Centronics 101 as an OEM peripheral for PDP-8 and PDP-11 minicomputers.
- Data General and NCR: Data General resold modified Centronics 101, 306, and PrintStation 350 units within its Dasher peripheral line, while NCR rebadged the PrintStation 350 series for retail, banking, and point-of-sale systems.
- Wang Laboratories: Following its 1971 spin-off, Centronics continued supplying impact printers (including the 101 and 300 series) to Wang for its early word processing systems.
- Commodore and Heathkit: Commodore sourced the Centronics 779 (connected via an IEEE-488 interface adapter) for early Commodore PET systems before launching its own printer line, while Heathkit and Zenith Data Systems offered rebadged Centronics 730 and 779 models for the H8 and H89 microcomputers.
- Mainframe terminal vendors: Control Data Corporation (CDC), Decision Data, and ITT Courier rebadged PrintStation 350 and LineWriter band printers for IBM 3270-compatible cluster and mainframe installations.

=== 1980 setbacks and Control Data takeover ===
In 1980, Centronics introduced the Mini-Printer Model 770, a low-cost desktop serial matrix printer and the first model built entirely in-house. Flaws in the printer's microprocessor forced a product recall and a year-long manufacturing halt. During this hiatus, competitors such as Epson and Brother captured substantial market share from which Centronics never fully recovered. That same year, the company introduced the E Series 900 and 1200 lines-per-minute (LPM) band printers.

Between 1980 and 1985, Centronics accumulated $80 million in losses. In 1982, Control Data Corporation (CDC) merged its printer subsidiary, CPI, into Centronics and invested $25 million in the company, effectively taking operational control from Howard.

=== Product expansion and OEM reliance ===
Logo used briefly from 1986 until the sale to GENICOM in 1987

Despite financial difficulties, Centronics remained active in product development, acquisitions, and OEM supply during the mid-1980s:

- New product lines: The LineWriter 400 and 800 band printers debuted in 1983 and 1984, respectively, remaining in production through 1995. In 1984, Centronics also launched the GLP (Great Little Printer), a budget serial matrix series, while continuing its relationship with Brother by sourcing several PrintStation models as rebadged Brother units. In 1986, Centronics released its only laser printer, the eight-page-per-minute PagePrinter 8 (PP8), which used a Sharp copier engine and a 6800-based controller jointly developed by Sharp and Centronics. Priced at $2,495, the PP8 cost $500 less than the competing HP LaserJet; a faster follow-up model was announced but never materialized.
- OEM dependence: The PrintStation 350 serial matrix series achieved strong OEM adoption, sold under the brands of Data General, ITT Courier, NCR, CDC, Decision Data, and ISI. Most notably, Centronics manufactured a modified PS350 sold as the IBM 4214. In 1985, IBM 4214 contracts accounted for $65 million of Centronics' $126 million total revenue; when IBM ended production in 1986, Centronics' revenue fell sharply.
- Acquisitions: Centronics acquired exclusive marketing rights to Trilog color matrix printers in 1984 before purchasing Trilog outright in January 1985. In 1986, it acquired sheet-feeder manufacturer Advanced Terminals and BDS Computer Australia Pty Ltd.

=== Ownership changes and printer division sale ===
Control Data maintained its controlling stake until 1986, when its interest was acquired by an investor group affiliated with Drexel Burnham Lambert (led by senior bankers Stephen D. Weinroth and G. Chris Andersen); Centronics subsequently bought back the Drexel interest in 1987. On June 23, 1986, Centronics unveiled a new corporate logo, though it gained little market recognition before the company exited the printer industry, and GENICOM continued using the original logo for printer and supply sales.

In 1987, Centronics sold its printer business to GENICOM for $87 million. Remaining listed on the New York Stock Exchange, the corporate entity shortened its name to Centronics Corporation in 1987. After using the sale proceeds to acquire Ekco Housewares in 1988 for $125 million, the company reorganized and renamed itself Ekco Group, Inc. in 1988.

== Centronics 101 ==
The Centronics 101, introduced in 1970, offered high speed and relative affordability for its era. Selected specifications included:

- Print speed: 165 characters per second
- Weight: 118 pounds (53.5 kg)
- Dimensions: 27.5 in (70 cm) W × 11.25 in (29 cm) H × 19.25 in (49 cm) D
- Shipping weight: 200 pounds (91 kg) in a wooden crate secured with 36 screws
- Character set: 62 characters (10 numeric, 26 uppercase, and 26 special characters; no lowercase)
- Pitch and spacing: 10 characters per inch; 6 lines per inch
- Vertical control: Punched tape reader for top-of-form and vertical tab
- Paper handling: Original plus up to four carbon copies
- Interfaces: Centronics parallel (standard), RS-232 serial (optional)

== Legacy ==
The 36-pin micro ribbon connectors developed for the Centronics parallel interface became a de facto industry standard known as the "Centronics connector". While IBM PCs used a DB-25 connector on the host computer side, the 36-pin Centronics connector remained the standard on the printer end of parallel cables—later codified as Compatibility Mode under the IEEE 1284 standard in 1994—until USB replaced parallel ports in the late 1990s and early 2000s.
