= Tally (company) =

Printer company 1949-2003

Tally. Ltd.
- Industry: Printers
- Founded: 1949
- Defunct: 2003
- Fate: Merged
- Successor: TallyGenicom
- Headquarters: Kent, Washington

Tally was a leading American manufacturer of computer printers. In 1979, they merged with Mannesmann's printer division to become Mannesmann Tally, by which they are better known. From 2003, their successor company has been TallyGenicom.

== History ==
Founded in 1949 in Kent, Washington, United States by Philip Renshaw, the company was a leading manufacturer of punch tape readers. In 1970 Tally developed line matrix printer technologies and became a leader in the printer industry.

In 1972 Mannesmann Präzisiontechnik was founded as a subsidiary of Mannesmann AG, specialising in dot matrix printers. In 1979 Tally and Mannesmann Präzisiontechnik were merged to form Mannesmann Tally, part of the Mannesmann Kienzle computer group. Mannesmann Tally offered printing solutions in all major technologies into all key markets, along with service and support.

Printers providing APL characters were produced in cooperation with I. P. Sharp Associates in order to support their international timesharing network. The flexible, though challenging, method of pin-firing allowed the full APL set of characters to be printed as well as an enhanced set of more universal (worldwide) glyphs. James C. Field created the dot-matrix images with the help of a software trick invented by L. M. Breed (q.v).

In 1996 Tally was reformed as part of a management buy out from Mannesmann, backed by Legal & General Ventures. World headquarters was in Elchingen, Germany with subsidiaries and business partners in more than 130 countries. Production continued in Elchingen for serial dot matrix and professional inkjet printers, and in Kent for line printers and color development.

In 2003, Tally merged with GENICOM to form TallyGenicom. In 2009, the TallyGenicom brand was acquired by Printronix. The intellectual property and worldwide distribution rights for the TallyGenicom serial matrix, inkjet and thermal technologies were retained by TallyGenicom AG and acquired by DASCOM in June 2009. DASCOM Europe now market the full range of the former TallyGenicom brand of serial, passbook and mobile printers under the ‘Tally' brand name.
