= Quality Micro Systems =

QMS, Inc.

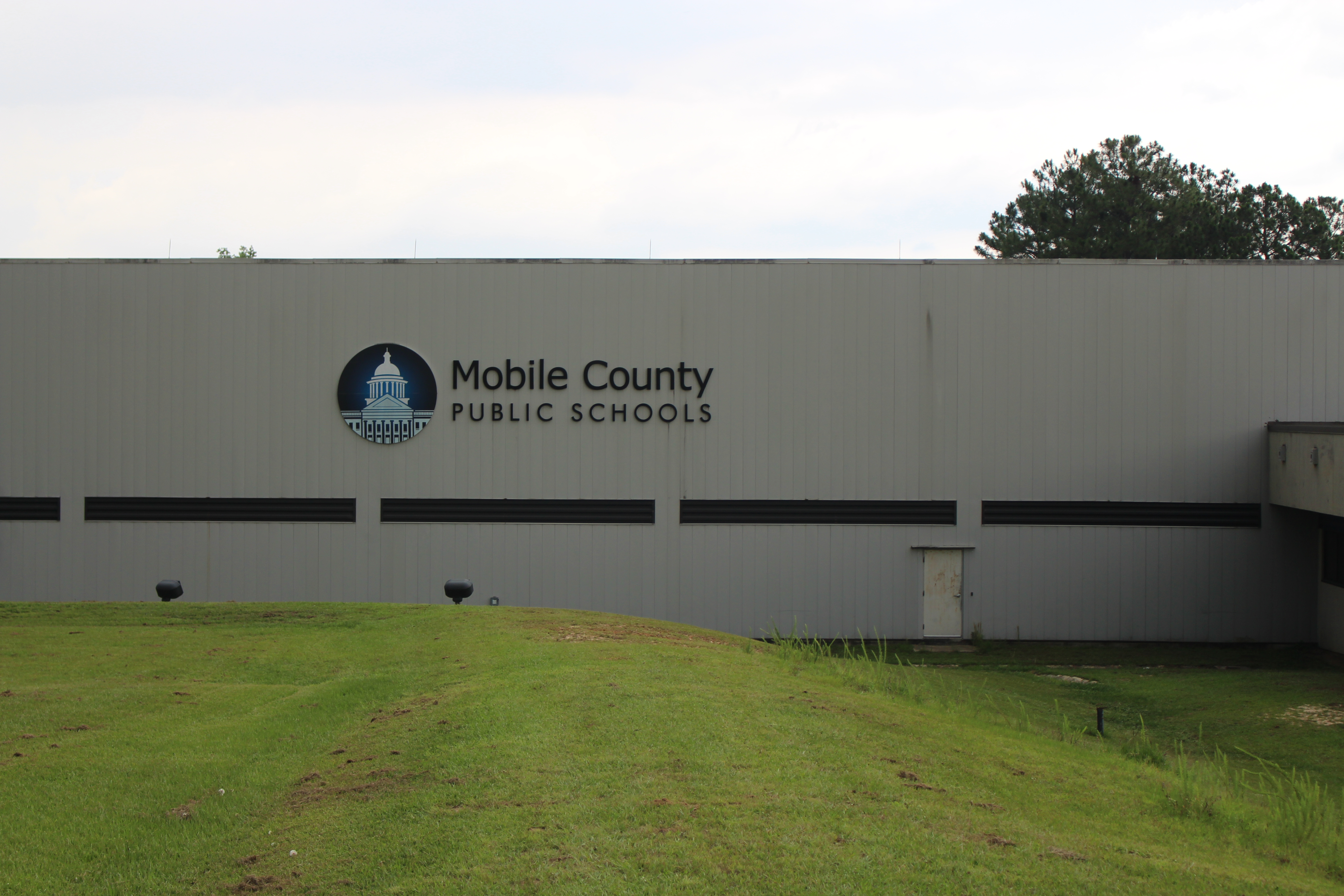
- Site of former headquarters of Quality Micro Systems in Mobile, Alabama, now occupied by the Mobile County Public School System
- Formerly: Quality Micro Systems, Inc. (1977–1984)
- Type: Private (1977–1983, 2000–2003); Public (1983–2000)
- Industry: Computer
- Founded: August 12, 1977; 49 years ago in Mobile, Alabama, United States
- Founder: James Busby
- Defunct: April 2000; 26 years ago
- Fate: Acquired by Minolta; consolidated into Konica Minolta in 2003
- Successor: Minolta-QMS
- Products: Printers
- Number of employees: 1,500 (1987, peak)
- Website: qms.com (archived)

Quality Micro Systems, Inc. (QMS), later QMS, Inc., was an American computer hardware company independently active from 1977 to 2000 and based in Mobile, Alabama. Founded to produce industrial label printers, the company eventually became a leading manufacturer of consumer and professional laser printers for personal computers and graphical workstations. In 2000, the company was acquired by the Japanese electronics conglomerate Minolta and made a subsidiary.

== History ==
=== Foundation and early years (1977–1982) ===
Quality Micro Systems, Inc., was founded in 1977 in Mobile, Alabama, by James Busby, an engineer who studied at the University of Alabama before working at the Scott Paper Company as a systems engineer. It was incorporated in Mobile on August 12, 1977, a few months after Busby quit Scott to found his own company after Scott expressed disinterest in commercializing a prototype controller board that Busby had devised at his home. Busby's prototype board was capable of turning a large-format impact printer into a label maker that could be used print labels and barcodes in any format and size (in essence, a type of raster image processor, or RIP). Busby repurposed his son's bedroom into a makeshift workshop and produced more prototypes of his label printer before renting out an office in Mobile in December 1977 and hiring his first permanent employee in 1978.

In the summer of 1978, by which point the company had six full-time employees, QMS launched its first product, the Magnum 300, a refined version of Busby's prototype controller board compatible with the Printronix 300, a large-format impact printer popular with minicomputer users. In its first full year of operation, QMS earned a profit of $4,000 on sales of $200,000. At the 1978 National Computer Conference in Anaheim, California, Busby was able to convince 18 distributors to resell the Magnum 300, and by 1980 QMS had a diverse product roster of RIPs and had inked deals with major computer vendors such as IBM and Burroughs to resell QMS's cards to their installed base. In the late 1970s, Busby's brother-in-law and the future mayor of Mobile, Mike Dow, joined QMS as a sales manager.

=== Growth and international expansion (1982–1987) ===
QMS became an international company in 1982 after establishing a small factory in the Netherlands to build some of its products locally for the European market. In January 1983, by which point the company had 100 employees, QMS filed its initial public offering and became a publicly traded company. Simultaneously, the company began construction of a 50,000-square-foot manufacturing plant down the road from their existing 16,000-square-foot plant in Mobile and planned to hire 400 more workers.

In mid-1983, QMS introduced its first laser printer, the Lasergrafix 1200, which was capable of printing 12 pages per minute at 300 dots per inch (dpi). One of the first laser printers available for the desktop market, the Lasergrafix 1200 sold very well for QMS, the company earning $2.4 million in income on $14 million in sales in 1983, a 60 percent increase in profit from 1982, primarily on the strength of the Lasergrafix.

In April 1984, QMS entered a $2-million deal with Intergraph of Huntsville, Alabama, to supply the latter with QMS's laser printers for use with Intergraph's Unix-based CAD/CAM graphical workstations. In May 1984, QMS rounded out its laser printer line by introducing the Lasergrafix 800, a compact tabletop laser printer aimed at the personal computer market, and the Lasergrafix 2400, a larger floor-standing unit aimed at the high-end desktop publishing market. In 1985, QMS introduced the first sub-$2,000 laser printer with the QMS Kiss.

In July 1984, the company was reincorporated as QMS, Inc., and it acquired Merriwether Circuits Design, Inc. (MCD), a printed circuit board (PCB) manufacturing firm in Fort Walton Beach, Florida. Shortly after acquiring MCD, QMS established Quality Circuits, Inc. (QCI), a contract PCB manufacturer originally run out of MCD's old factory in Fort Walton Beach that also acted as an autonomous division within QMS. QMS planned on raising a new $2-million, 25,000-square-foot factory for QCI in late 1984.

=== Failed HP deal and further innovations (1987–1993) ===
Employment peaked at QMS in mid-1987 with 1,500 workers internationally, while revenue peaked that year at $9 million on record profits of $119 million. In August 1987, the company signed a deal with Hewlett-Packard (HP) worth $50 million to design and market the JetScript, a PostScript RIP built into an ISA card for IBM PC (and compatibles). HP was to resell these boards to their customers, with QMS netting a healthy profit. Initially promising for QMS, the deal with HP went severely overbudget for QMS after both the global stock market crashed in October 1987 and a shortage of dynamic RAM chips occurred in early 1988. Although QMS's revenue peaked at $187 million in 1988, the company ultimately suffered $5 million in losses largely on account of unexpected costs in the JetScript deal. HP terminated its deal with QMS in 1989 after redesigning its LaserJet printer and sourcing another vendor of RIP boards. In the wake of the deal's termination, QMS was forced to write of $10 million in unsold inventory.

Fearing a board-room ouster, Busby hired a new chief financial officer, Charles Daley, who instituted stricter accounting practices and inventory controls and restricted the company's budget and operating expenses while continuing to fund QMS's research and development into cutting-edge products. QMS returned to profitability in 1989. In March 1988, the company acquired Imagen Corporation, a developer of page description languages (PDL) and other printing technologies, for $17.5 million. In 1990, it introduced in Japan the first color laser printer capable of outputting kanji in the JIS X 0208 character set. In the same year, the company introduced the first auto-switching printer with the QMS 410 laser printer. This printer could detect the PDL of a document that has been sent to it (such as PostScript or PCL) and switch to a compatible emulation mode dynamically, without the user having to switch out hardware RIPs or manually configure the printer's current emulation mode in software.

=== Decline and acquisition by Minolta (1993–2003) ===
Between 1993 and 1995, the company experienced three rounds of layoffs concurrent with the laser printer maturing and becoming a commodity among personal computer users. The company suffered heavy losses in 1995—losing $44.2 million across the entire fiscal year and losing $20.3 million in the final quarter alone. After instituting another layoff in 1997, Busby resigned as CEO of QMS. He was replaced by Edward E. Lucente, a veteran of IBM.

In June 1999, the Japanese electronics conglomerate Minolta agreed to purchase a 57-percent controlling interest in QMS for $64 million. In April 2000, the company was renamed from QMS, Inc., to Minolta-QMS, reflecting this new business relationship. In September 2000, Minolta agreed to purchase the remaining shares from QMS's American shareholers and take the company private. In 2003, Mintola shed the QMS name from their Mobile operations after merging with Konica of Japan to form Konica Minolta.
