= TallyGenicom =

American printer manufacturer

- Industry: Printers
- Predecessor: GENICOM, Tally
- Founded: 2009
- Successor: Printronix, DASCOM

The TallyGenicom brand, acquired by Printronix in 2009, includes laser and line matrix printers, parts, consumables and service. Printronix now owns the intellectual property and worldwide sales distribution rights for TallyGenicom line matrix and laser technologies, including printers, supplies and consumables. TallyGenicom AG retained all intellectual property and worldwide distribution rights for the TallyGenicom serial matrix, inkjet and thermal technologies, including printers and options, supplies and consumables.

In June 2009, DASCOM acquired the key assets of TallyGenicom AG and TallyGenicom Computerdrucker GmbH in order to establish its European operation, which is named DASCOM Europe. DASCOM Europe manufactures and markets a range of dot matrix, passbook, flatbed, mobile and thermal printers under both the 'Tally' and 'Tally Dascom' brand names.

DASCOM will continue to resell TallyGenicom-branded line matrix and laser products purchased from Printronix, and Printronix will resell serial matrix products purchased from DASCOM.

In June 2011, Printronix followed with the introduction of its TallyGenicom 6600 cartridge line matrix series which claimed print speeds of up to 2,000 lines per minute.

== History ==
Tally AG was founded in 1948 by Philip Renshaw, focusing on design, development, manufacturing, distribution and servicing of printers for high-volume industrial and business applications. Tally was a key innovator in line matrix and industrial inkjet technologies and had become a player in the color laser market. Headquartered in Ulm, Germany, Tally's American operations had been based in Kent, Washington.

Prior to the merger of Tally and Genicom on August 7, 2003, GENICOM LP, was one of leading manufacturers of printers. The company designed and marketed a wide range of high-performance laser, serial and line matrix printers that it offered with a complementary line of consumables, parts and services.

TallyGenicom was formed in August 2003 with the merger of Tally and GENICOM. At this time, Arsenal Capital Partners was the majority owner. TallyGenicom's U.S.-based assets were acquired by Printronix in 2009. All intellectual property and worldwide distribution rights for the TallyGenicom serial matrix, inkjet and thermal technologies were retained by TallyGenicom AG and acquired by DASCOM in June 2009.

== Products ==
- Laser Printers: 9045N, 9050N
- Line Matrix Printers: 6300 series, LG series, LJ series, T6200 series, 6600 series
- Serial Matrix Printers: 2240/2340, 2150/2250, LA550, 2265+/2280, LA650, LA800, 2365/2380, 2900
