= Decision Data =

Defunct American computer hardware

Decision Industries Corporation
- Formerly: Decision Data Computer Corporation
- Industry: Computers
- Founded: 1969; 57 years ago in Horsham, Pennsylvania
- Founder: Loren A. Schultz
- Defunct: 1988; 38 years ago
- Fate: Acquired by Onset Corporation
- Successor: Decision Data Inc.; DecisionOne
- Products: Hardware
- Number of employees: 1,783 (1987)

Decision Data Computer Corporation, later Decision Industries Corporation and Decision Data Inc., was an American computer hardware company founded in 1969 and based in Horsham, Pennsylvania.

== History ==
=== 1970s ===
Decision Data Computer Corporation was founded in Horsham, Pennsylvania in 1969 by Loren A. Schultz (1927–2018), who had worked as a sales representative and as a manager for the UNIVAC division of Sperry Rand. The company's first offerings between 1969 and the mid-1970s were keypunch machines, including the 9650 Multifunction Card Unit, compatible with IBM's identically titled MFCUs for their midrange System/3 and mainframe System/360 computers and said to be comparable in performance. By 1975, the company had manufacturing operations overseas in Europe, although the company responsible for these items was placed in receivership in September 1975. Also by 1975, Decision Data went public in the stock market.

Decision Data greatly expanded its breadth of products between 1974 and 1976, including a clone of IBM's 5496 Data Recorder for the System/3; a standalone device that converts paper tape to 80-column punched card (this task previously required a mini- or mainframe to accomplish); add-on MOSFET RAM boards for the System/3 Model 10; standalone keypunch keyboards available in various programming language dialects; and line printers for IBM's System/3 Models 8, 10, 12, and 15. Decision Data's line printers were originally designed by Dataproducts of Woodland Hills, California. In 1977, the company announced a clone of IBM's 2780 remote job entry workstation, named the CS 780, as well as the Model 3240 teleprinter.

Following a decline in sales of aftermarket products for IBM computers in the first half of 1975, Decision Data began test marketing its own line of midrange computer systems in Philadelphia following the summer of 1975. Named the Decision Data System 4, the computer was commissioned and co-designed by UNIVAC Sperry Rand in 1974, initially for it to rebadged as the UNIVAC BC-7. 20 installations of this system were put up in small businesses in Philadelphia by September 1975. It utilized the same MOSFET RAM chips used in their IBM System/3 RAM expansion cards (available in configurations with between 32 KB and 65 KB of RAM) and ran off the Intel 8080 microprocessor. Most of Decision Data's wares were either rented or sold; some, like their line printers, had sale prices into the low five digits.

In 1976, the company established a division that was a combined service bureau and supplier of hardware and spare parts. Named Decision Data Supplies and Service Organization, decades later this division was spun off and renamed DecisionOne. It had established 70 offices in the U.S. and Canada by the decade's end. By 1996, DecisionOne employed 6,000 people.

The parent company's 1975 sales slump continued into the first half of 1976, and it was revealed that the company ran at a loss of US$8.4 million the previous year, for which the contemporaneous recession was blamed. The company fared better in 1977, and the same year the company began ramping up production of their System 4 minicomputer, aimed at first-time enterprise buyers of disk-based minis and those seeking to upgrade from the System/3. The System 4's performance was seen as on par with IBM's System/34. As a bonus for Decision Data, the System 4 could make use of Decision Data's existing family of card readers, where as IBM's System/34 could not natively support any. Decision Data's revenue reached a new height in 1978, although the company had to ease back development of the System 4, as its market penetration grew at a rate slower than expected.

=== 1980s – 1990s ===
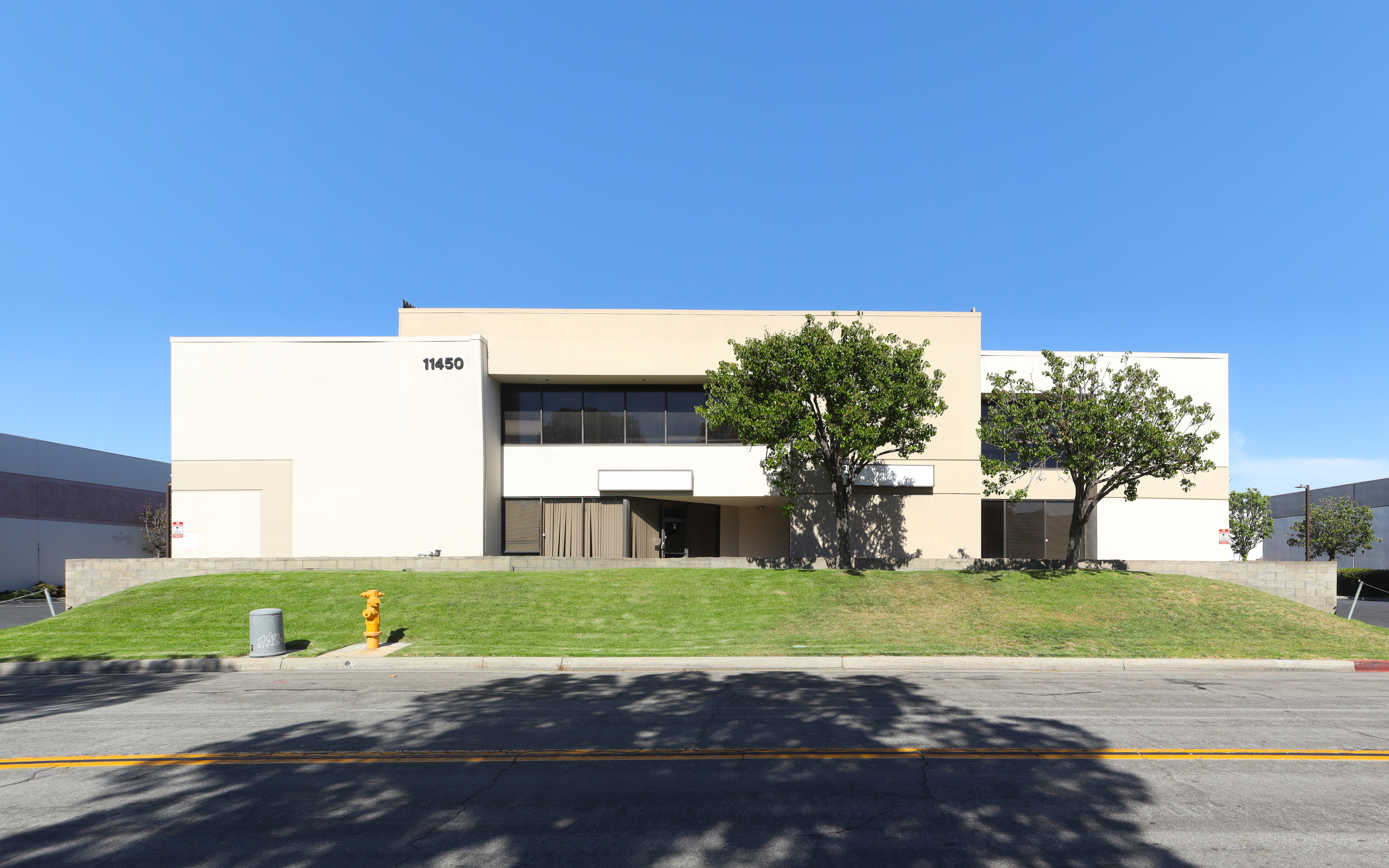
Former headquarters of Decision Data Panatec in Garden Grove, California, pictured in 2021

In April 1986, shareholders of the company agreed to rename Decision Data Computer Corporation to Decision Industries Corporation. In May 1986, Decision Industries acquired Panatec, Inc., an application and operating system developer based in Garden Grove, California. The same year, they acquired the Beverage Systems Division of the Charlotte, North Carolina–based Endata, a company which supplied turnkey software and computer systems for the beverage industry. In 1987, a hostile takeover of the company for absorption into Econocom International N.V. was launched but fizzled. In September 1988, the Onset Corporation acquired Decision Industries in a leveraged buyout, renaming the division to Decision Data Inc. and allowing its two subsidiaries, Decision Data Computer Corporation and Decision Data Service, to continue operations. In 1992, Decision Data Inc. acquired the remnants of Qantel Corporation—the new name for the restructured Mohawk Data Sciences Corporation.

Following the acquisition, Decision Data Inc. employed 1,965 in 1990. By the end of the decade, Decision Data Inc. was later purchased by another company for $200 million.
