= Katun Corporation =

- Founded: 1979
- Founder: T. Michael Clarke; David G. Jorgensen
- Headquarters: United States

Katun (/ˈkeɪtən/ KAY-tən) is a supplier of OEM-compatible imaging consumables and supplies for office equipment.

== History ==
Katun was founded in 1979 by T. Michael Clarke and David G. Jorgensen. Katun is a privately held company that serves approximately 14,000 dealer, distributor, and reseller customers in 138 different countries around the world. Katun's headquarters is located in Minneapolis, Minnesota.

== Establishment and Accomplishments ==
=== 1979-1990 ===
Katun started out with 15 employees and offered a limited number of parts. By 1980, Katun employed over 50 people and began to develop parts for liquid toner copiers and Savin imaging equipment.

In 1983, Katun acquired Bedford International, a distributor of copier parts and supplies in Europe.

In 1985, Katun established its first international facility in France.

By 1987, Katun had customers in over 100 countries. The company developed a universal toner that is still used in Canon copiers, and it also introduced its first OPC (Organic Photo Conductor) drum. Additionally, Katun opened new facilities in Germany and the Netherlands.

=== 1991-2002 ===
In 1991, Katun introduced its first amorphous silicon (a-Si) drum and remanufactured drum unit/cartridge.

Katun became a fuser roller manufacturer.

In 1994, Katun opened a newly constructed North American Distribution Center in Davenport, Iowa and became the first aftermarket company to sell “patch technology” that allowed Katun to offer a fully compatible OPC drum that enabled normal functionality in Sharp machines. Katun also acquired the parent companies of Tepro and Franchini, Katun's largest aftermarket OEM-compatible competitor.

The first TUF/SIL upper fuser roller was presented and patented in 1996. New distribution centers in the Netherlands and Aguascalientes, Mexico were opened.

From 1996-1999, according to the joint federal-state case against founder T. Michael Clarke, $3.4 million in company funds was taken from the company for his personal use and not reported to the IRS, avoiding $1.4 million in federal taxes. In 2003, Clarke pleaded guilty to four counts of filing false tax returns for the years 1996-1999. Clarke also pleaded guilty in Hennepin County District Court to evading more than $50,000 in state sales taxes for the purchases of jewelry, guns and cars. He was sentenced to two years in prison.

In 1997, Katun opened a distribution center in Singapore and facilities in Brazil, Argentina, Australia, and Uruguay the following year. Katun was the first aftermarket company to sell a positive charge OPC drum. In 1999, Katun launched the Katun Online Catalog.

In 2002, Katun became associated with Parts Now, the world's largest distributor of printer parts, when the investment group PNA Holdings LLC bought both companies.

=== 2002-2013 ===
Katun was the first aftermarket company to introduce a PXP chemical toner in 2005, and won the 2005 Minnesota Governor's International Trade Award. Katun also opened a new office in China.

In 2007, Katun Performance color toner was introduced, including products for use in Ricoh, Canon, Konica Minolta, and Toshiba color multifunctional devices. RTS Imaging of Sydney became Katun's first Premier Distributor for copier imaging parts and supplies in both Australia and New Zealand.

In 2008, Katun was acquired by Monomoy Capital Partners.

Genuine Supply Source in Canada became Katun's second Premier Distributor for copier imaging supplies and parts in 2010. Katun also established a contract with IKON Office Solutions. Katun also acquired Media Sciences, Inc., a supplier of compatible color printer toner and solid ink products.

In 2013, Katun introduced trickle feed technology and positive charge color toners. As of 2013, Katun toners had produced over 25 billion color pages and one trillion pages overall.

== Products ==
Katun produces 5,000 products for printers, copiers, multifunctional devices, fax machines, digital duplicators, and other machines that are used in the process of making a copy or print.

=== Copiers/MFP Products ===
==== Imaging Supplies ====
Katun provides both color and monochrome imaging supplies for copiers and MFPs. The company sells approximately 1,900 color and monochrome toner products worldwide, with over 600 for copiers/MFPs.

==== Photoreceptors ====
OPC (Organic Photo Conductor) drums, a specialty of Katun since 1980, are used to capture a digital source image and transfer it to a blank page. OPC drums are offered for use in equipment sold by the major OEMs, including Canon, Konica Minolta, Panasonic, and Sharp. Katun offers more than 400 drums and drum unit/cartridges, selling approximately 1.2 million per year worldwide.

==== Copier/MFP Parts ====
Katun sells products for the maintenance of office equipment. These parts include waste toner containers, cleaning blades, fuser cleaning supplies, fuser, and pressure rollers and more.

=== Printer Products ===
Katun offers laser printer cartridges and printer components.

==== Consumables/Toner Cartridges ====
Katun offers more than 1200 consumable toner products for printers, including toner cartridges and bulk toner. Katun's acquisition of the Media Sciences, Inc. product line added over 550 color compatible, laser-based printer products to Katun's product offering, enabling Katun to provide products for most of the non-HP, color printer segment.

==== Remanufacturing Components ====
Katun's bulk toner, drums, drum cleaning blades, and other components are designed to work together, enabling their customers in the remanufacturing industry to produce laser toner cartridges.

==== Service Parts ====
Katun offers fuser units and maintenance kits to service printers when needed.

==== Remanufactured Printers ====
Remanufactured printers are provided by Katun in North America as an alternative to buying a new, expensive printer.

=== Digital Duplicators ===
Black inks and masters are used in Riso, Ricoh, and other OEM machines.

=== Managed Print Services ===
Managed Print Services (MPS) is a service offering from a dealer to a business that provides hardware, services, and all consumables for a contracted cost-per-page. MPS assists business organizations, allowing for the management of imaging devices and better control of document outputs. Katun provides software (Europe) and support programs (North America) to help dealers leverage their MPS opportunities and grow their businesses.

=== Accessories ===
==== Vacuums ====
Katun also offers other service vacuums, several filter types, nozzles, brushes and carrying cases.

==== Cleaning Supplies and Lubricants ====
Katun produces its own brand of wipes and cleaners, in addition to such as Kimberly-Clark and Tech Spray. Katun also provides selected greases and lubricants.

==== Tools ====
Katun produces tool kits, including a selection of screwdrivers from Snap-on. Customers can personalize tool kits by choosing from a variety of pliers, knives, wrenches, and other tools.

==== Additional Accessories ====
Accessories such as surge protectors, test patterns, and specially designed carts.

== Environmental Record ==
Katun operates a unit cartridge core return program that allows dealers in North America and Western Europe to return used drum unit cartridges to Katun. Katun uses recycling and disposal practices to help minimize environmental impact.
