= Solid ink =

Type of ink used in printing

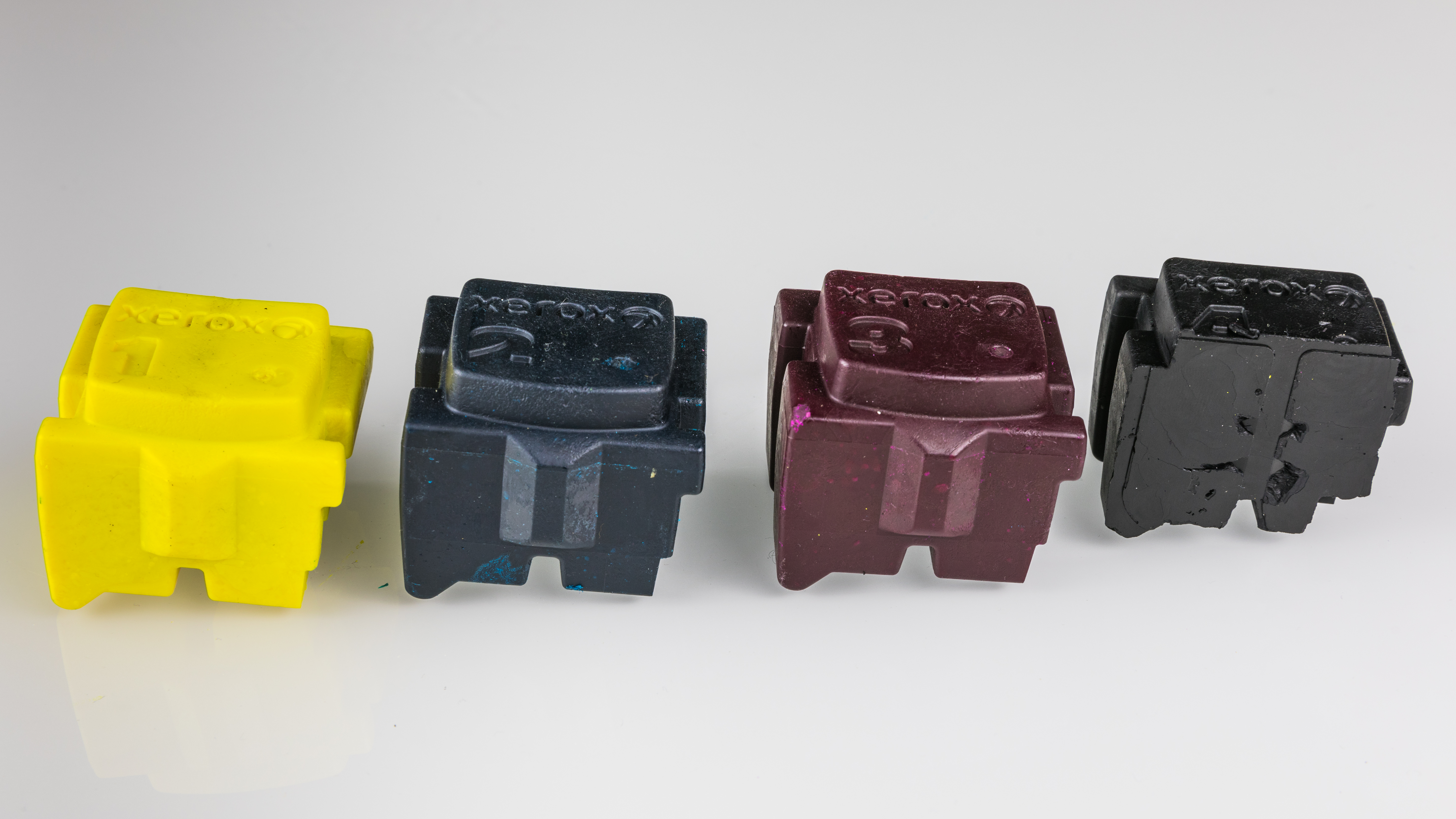
Yellow cyan magenta and black solid ink sticks. The black ink stick is cut in half.

Solid ink (also known as hot melt ink) is a type of ink used in printing. Solid ink is a waxy, resin-based polymer that must be melted prior to usage, unlike conventional liquid inks. The technology is used most often in graphics and large-format printing environments where color vividness and cost efficiency are important.

== Design ==
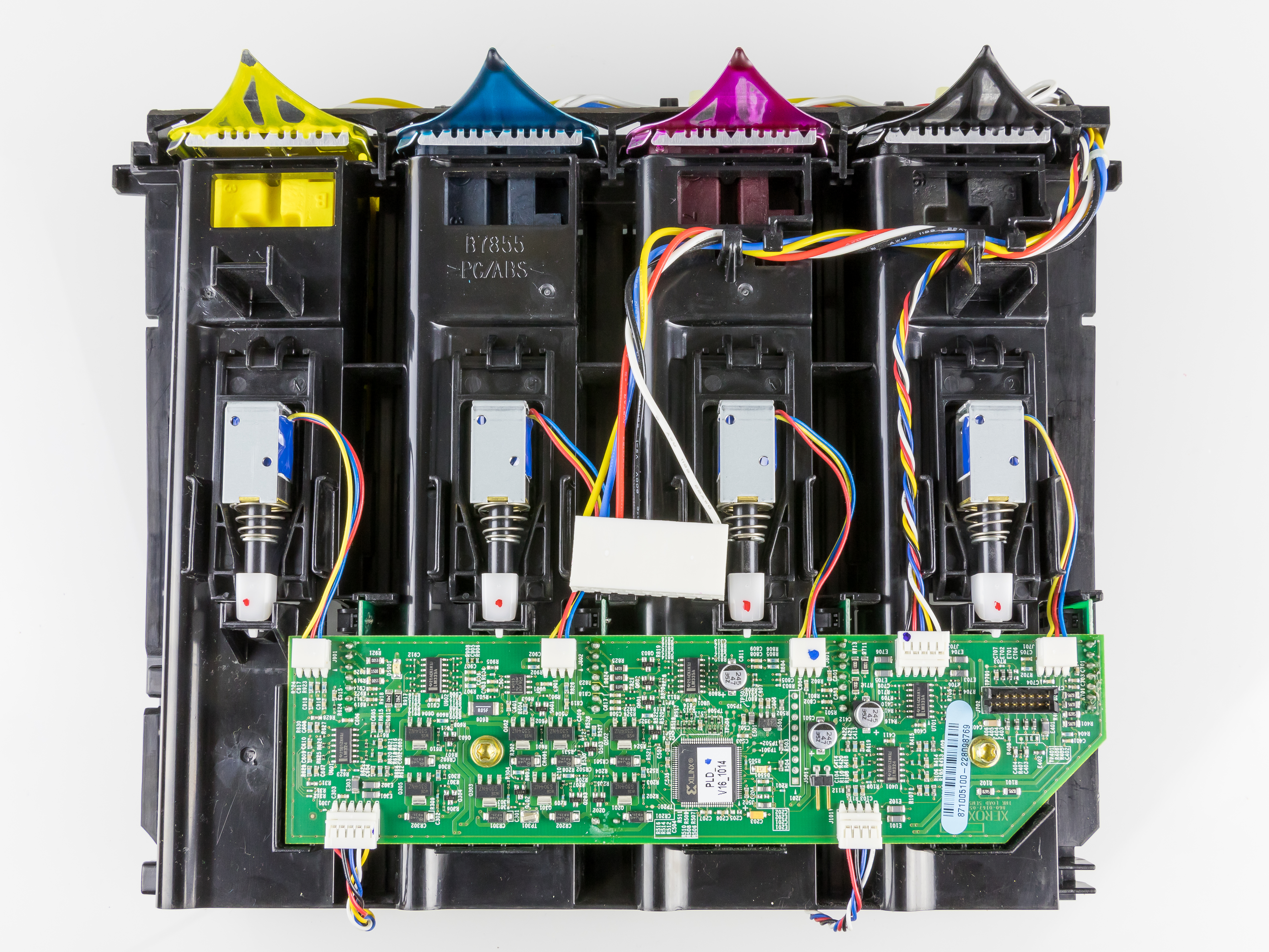
Ink heaters showing melted ink

Solid ink technology utilizes solid ink sticks, crayons, pearls or granular solid material instead of the fluid ink or toner powder usually used in printers. Some types of solid ink printers use small spheres or pucks of solid ink, which are stored in a hopper before being transferred to the printing head by a worm gear or melted as needed. After the solid ink is loaded into the printer, it is melted and used to print images on paper or any substrate in a process that can be similar to offset printing or standard printing.

Solid ink printers require heated printheads. Continuous Inkjet (CIJ) began the Solid ink industry by using wax and low temperature metal alloy ink in the late 1960s and early 1970s before Drop-On-Demand (DOD) was invented. DOD use piezoelectric devices (polarized ceramics) and heat alters the poling. Howtek broke the barrier of DOD high temperatures with the design of the Howtek style DOD inkjet in 1985. This allowed chemists to expand Solid inks into a new direction and led to a Three-Dimensional printing patent from an ex-Howtek employee who formed the company Visual Impact Corporation.

== Advantages ==
Due to the way solid ink printers put the ink onto the page, print quality is considered to be precise and accurate, with bright colors. Excellent results can be achieved with low-quality stock, as the Solid ink covers the stock with a glossy, almost opaque, surface. Solid ink printers are able to print on many different types and thicknesses of media. They are much less sensitive to changes in media type than are color laser printers.

Because solid blocks of ink are used, there is less waste generated than is with laser printers or inkjet printers, which produce empty ink or toner cartridges, in addition to packaging and packing materials. A loose ink block does not leave any residual cartridge after it is consumed – only a crushable, thin, plastic packing bag or tray and a recyclable cardboard packaging box.

Solid ink printers have an advantage over ink-jet printers for situations involving intermittent use with long periods of downtime. This is because melted solid ink that has subsequently cooled and re-solidified inside the ink-delivery pathways is a normal part of printer operation. So, this cooled-and-solidified ink does not dry out. And, while the printer is not operating, the solidified wax helps to prevent oxygen and moisture from interacting with many internal parts of the ink-delivery components.

Solid ink blocks can be made non-toxic and safe to handle. In the 1990s, the president of Tektronix ate a piece of solid ink, derived from food-grade processed vegetable oils, to demonstrate their safety. It may also be described like the coating on prescribed pills.

== Disadvantages ==
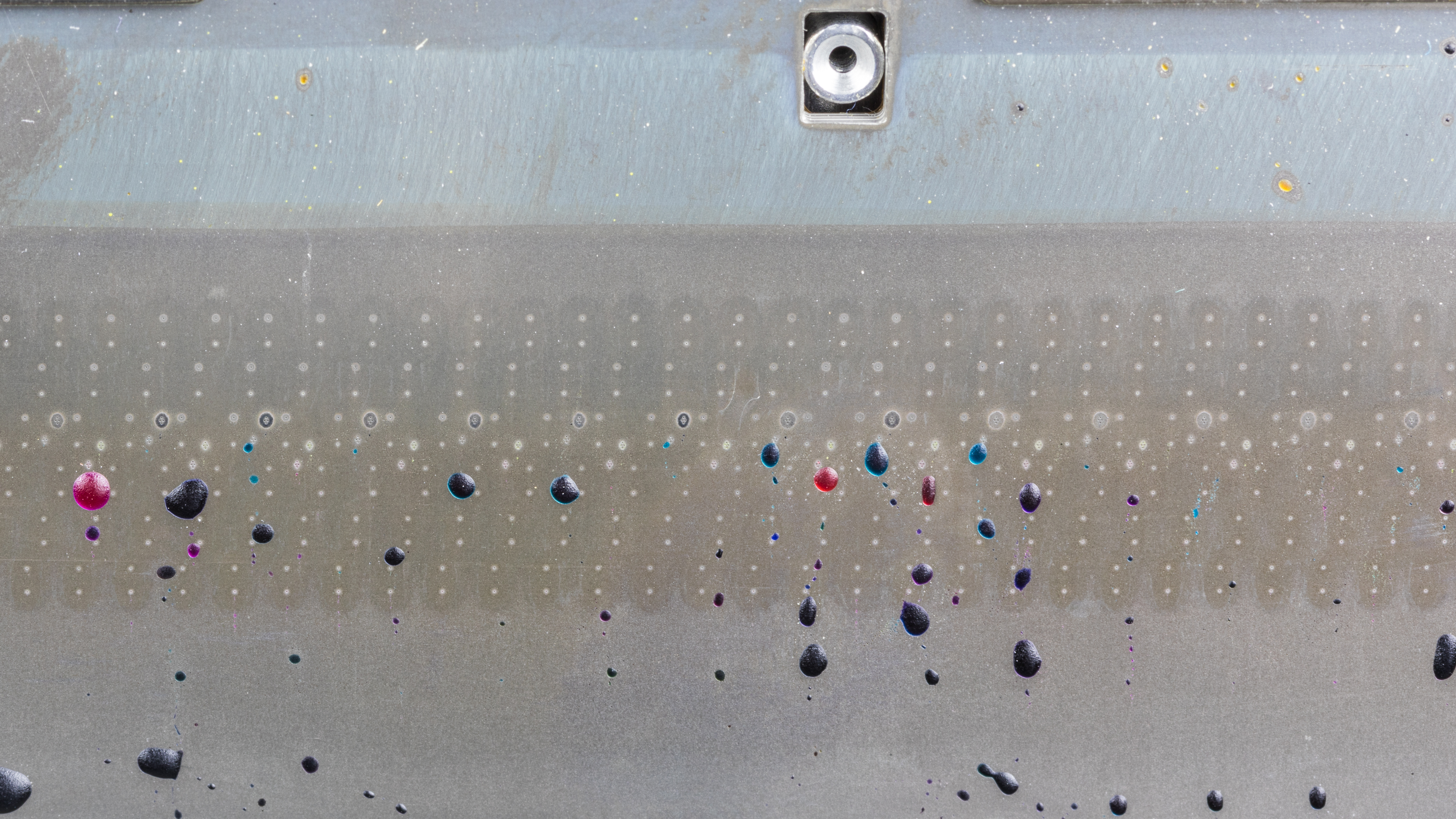
Printhead nozzles

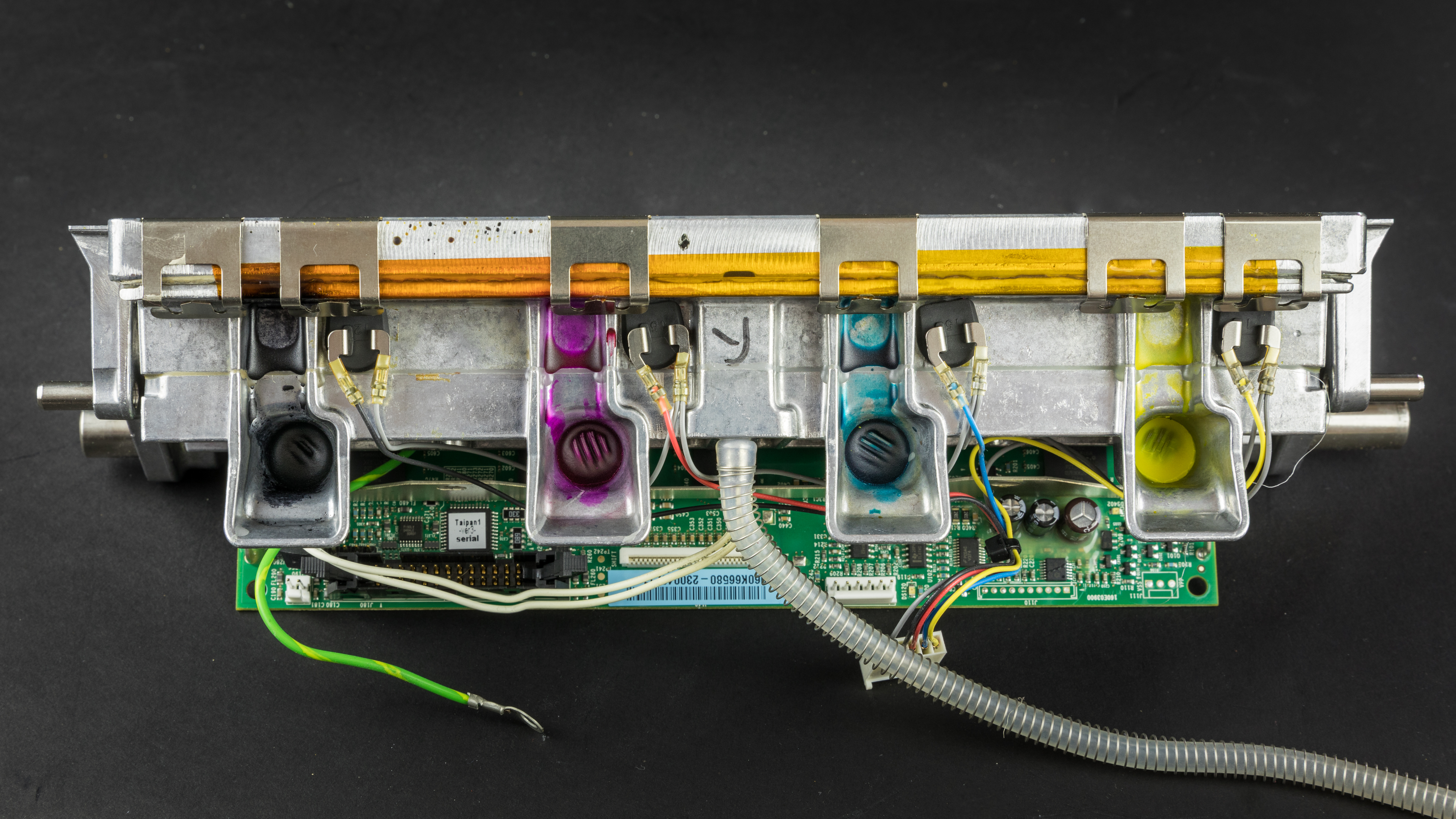
Ink reservoirs

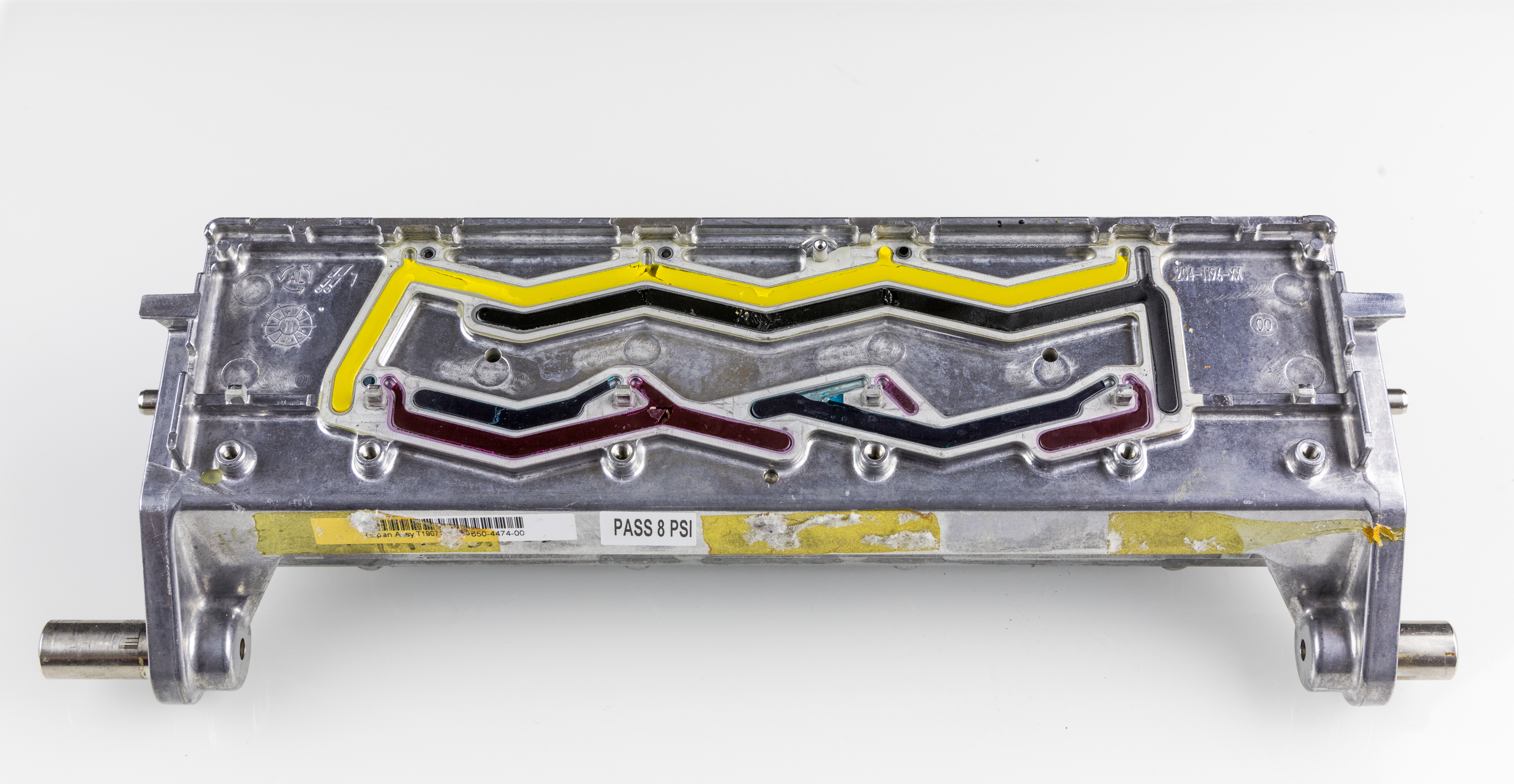
Printhead ink channels

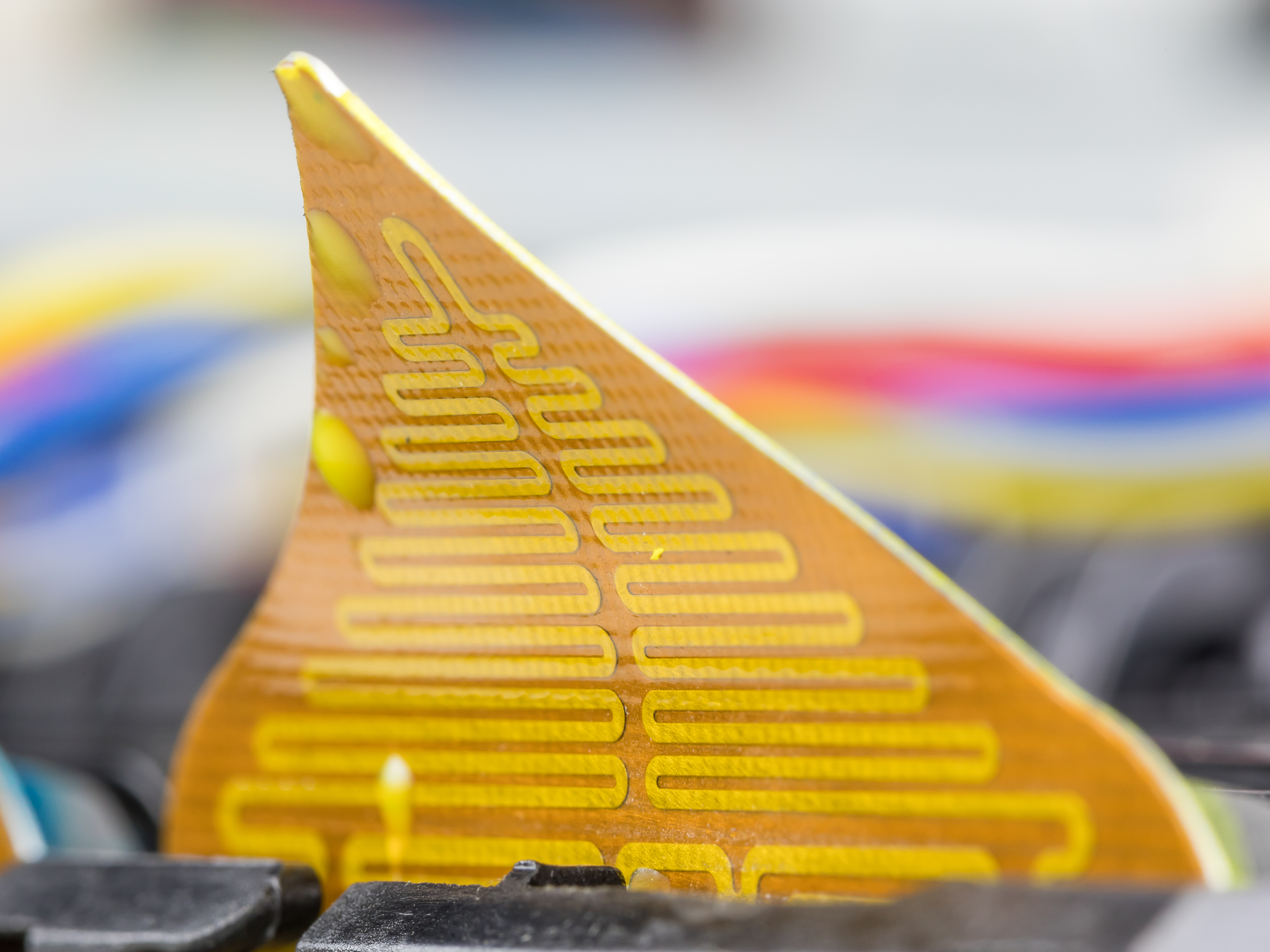
Ink melting heating element

Solid contaminants must be filtered out, or ink can clog printhead nozzles when using original or compatible inks. Clogging can damage the printhead, and replacing it can be costly. For this reason, many third-party ink manufacturers provide a guarantee and will pay for the replacement of a damaged printhead. Xerox also provides its own warranty.

When the device is cold, the first page it prints may take several tens of minutes to finish printing, as the printer needs to warm up and melt the ink. Once the printer has warmed up, ink can be melted significantly faster, so the melting process will have a much less noticeable negative impact on the overall speed at which additional pages are printed.

The ink must be heated, and a large portion of the printing mechanism must be kept at or near the ink's melting point during use. When the printer is in "sleep mode", most units keep a small pool of each color wax within the printhead heated to a temperature just above the ink's "freeze point". According to the Xerox service manual, this consumes about 50 watts.

Every time the printer loses power for long enough to cause the portion of ink which was being kept above its "freeze point" in the printhead to drop below that temperature, the mass of ink in each reservoir would have contracted in size enough (as a result of the cooling) to permit air to enter the printhead, which would result in print aberrations until the printhead reservoirs had been refilled by the ink-melt assembly above it. As a result, the printhead is then purged using a vacuum pump, causing some ink to be flushed from the printhead's holding tanks into the waste tray to remove the air from the printhead. (Xerox printers have a "waste ink" tray for this purpose. Since all four inks are dumped into a unified "waste ink" tray, it is impossible to reuse the lost ink since the four process colors coalesce to form a single solid mass in the tray, which look much like solidified candle wax drippings, but almost black.) If the printer was in its sleep state, less time without power would be required to necessitate a purge cycle than if the printer was in its ready-to-print state (since the printhead is kept much hotter when ready-to-print).

The printer contains melted wax when at operating temperature, and owners' manuals warn that it cannot be moved until it has completed a special cool-down cycle selected from the machine's control panel. It is recommended to provide a 30-minute cool down time from the point of removing main power. However, all modern solid-ink printers have a shutdown cycle which use fans to solidify the ink in less than ten minutes, with the added benefit of physically restraining the printhead to prevent damage during moving or shipping. The manuals warn that substantial damage is possible otherwise, requiring servicing by a trained technician if not properly cooled down before moving the printer. Moving the printer before cool down completes can damage the print head by spilling molten ink between reservoirs of different color as well as over other components inside the printer (motors, belts, etc.), and is not covered under maintenance or warranty. Because of the liquid-ink-spillage concern, solid-ink printers are not suitable for mobile usage, such as on movable carts for printing pricing tags in retail settings.

Unlike some inkjet printers where the cartridge includes the print head, the printhead in these printers is fixed. Over time, parts of the printhead may become permanently clogged, resulting in unsightly streaks, but there are printhead and drum cleaning cycles and jet-substitution options which can resolve most printing issues. There is a filter for the ingested ink implemented at least on the recent ColorQube devices (8570/8870), according to a service manual for those models. Dust caused by the use of cheap paper may cause printhead clogging, which is why Xerox recommends the use of papers that are not prone to giving off dust and fibers during regular usage. Paper dust may also accumulate as debris inside the printer; this could cause abrasions on the drum and may mimic a weak or missing jet. For this reason, the basic built-in drum-cleaning procedure is therefore recommended to be invoked at least three times before initiating printhead-nozzle cleaning cycle. The printhead system also contains a wiper-assembly unit that is used to wipe the printhead from dust, debris and residual ink, in order to protect the nozzles from clogging. Overall, the design of this system is robust: printheads have been known to last one million prints or more.

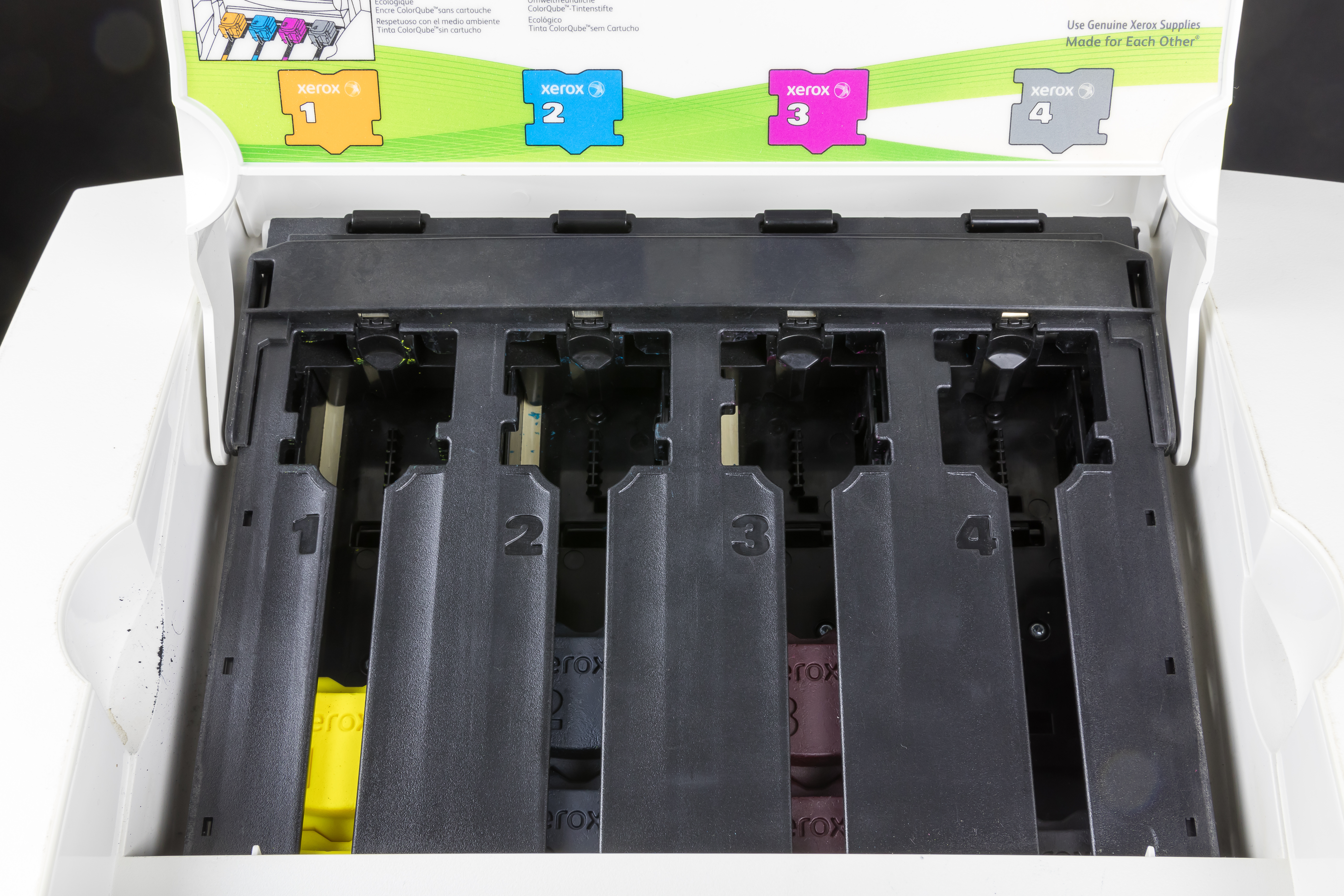
A Xerox ColorQube ink loader

Ink blocks are not compatible between Phaser models, due to Xerox changing each CMYK molded shape with each new model release due to changes in the formulation (and especially melt point) of the ink. Special openings prevent the insertion of ink sticks from the wrong model, or the wrong slot.

Lamination becomes difficult due to the nature of the ink technology. The ink melts and becomes smeared unless the laminator temperature is reduced to just enough to seal a pouch.

== History ==
Solid ink, hot-melt, or phase change ink was introduced in 1962 at Teletype Corporation in the Project 176. Solid ink is the name for ink that is solid at room temperature. Wax was introduced in the first solid ink product introduced with Continuous Inkjets in the Teletype Inktronic Terminal in 1966, but the patent for hot-melt wax did not issue until patent US3653932 April 4, 1972. In 1971, a patent, US3596285, was issued for a liquid metal recorder, a printer process that fabricated metal models of symbols, patterns, and characters. Liquid metal was referred to as hot-melt "type" ink in this patent, and it was introduced before the term "3D printing" was in use. These are examples of inks that create a 3D effect on the page.

In 1982, Robert Howard had the idea to build a small color printer system before he left Centronics Corporation. Two years later, he formed a new company, Howtek, Inc., to carry out this mission. The Pixelmaster printer used "hot melt" thermoplastic ink jetted by piezo crystals that could spit out millions of small droplets of ink of each of the primary colors (red, green, and blue) and black onto a piece of paper.

Although its creation was originally credited to Data Products, formerly Exxon, it was also credited to Howtek in 1984. Howtek solid inks prints colors by subtractive color deposition (layering).

Some founders and many former employees of Howtek left and joined 3D printing companies. Richard Helinksi formed C.A.D.-Cast, Inc. on October 27, 1989 (renamed to Visual Impact Corporation), a 3D printer company to build the Sculptor but later gave up after receiving a 3D Patent US 5136515A on August 4, 1992, and licensed it to Sanders Prototype, Inc. in 1993. Herb Menhennett joined Ballistic Particle Manufacturing (BPM) in 1993 with the Personal Modeler product. Both companies used Howtek style inkjets and thermoplastic materials. No fewer than three presidents of 3D companies were former Howtek employees and designers, vice presidents, engineers (including the inkjet engineer), chemists, buyers, secretaries, and technicians have all gone on to 3D companies.

Solid ink is a 3D material used in a single nozzle (Howtek squeeze style acoustical fluid chamber with sliced orifice) and also used in Multi-nozzle (bender or piston style fluid chambers with electro-formed orifice plates) inkjets. The Printheads must be heated. Wax based solid ink will flow below 100°C but thermoplastic solid ink prefers 125°C (close to the piezo Curie, piezo poling temperature). Piezo manufactures still insist the operating temperatures are dangerously high but the Howtek printheads work fine. Howtek style inkjets were designed to use solid ink in 4 minutes print cycles. Solidscape, Inc. 3D Printers, formerly Sanders Prototype, Inc. are now printing full 3D models that may print for 1 or 5 days at drop frequencies near 16,000 dpi. The solid ink is liquid at operating temperature and acts like water with sound waves (slower than water) forcing drops out of the orifice in the Howtek style inkjet.

Another solid ink printer, the SI-480, was developed and released to the market in 1988 by Dataproducts Corporation. This was a monochrome inkjet printer that met with limited success.

The next color solid ink printer, the Tektronix PhaserJet PXi, was introduced in June 1991 at a cost of nearly $10,000 US. Dataproducts Corporation released their color solid ink printer, the Jolt, in September 1991.

In the 1990s, a succession of solid ink printers capable of printing up to tabloid extra size were introduced, including the Tektronix Phaser III, the Tektronix Phaser 300, and culminating with the Tektronix Phaser 380 in 1997. A wide-format solid-ink printer, the Phaser 600, was introduced in 1996. The Phaser 600 was capable of using roll fed or sheet fed paper up to 48 inches wide.

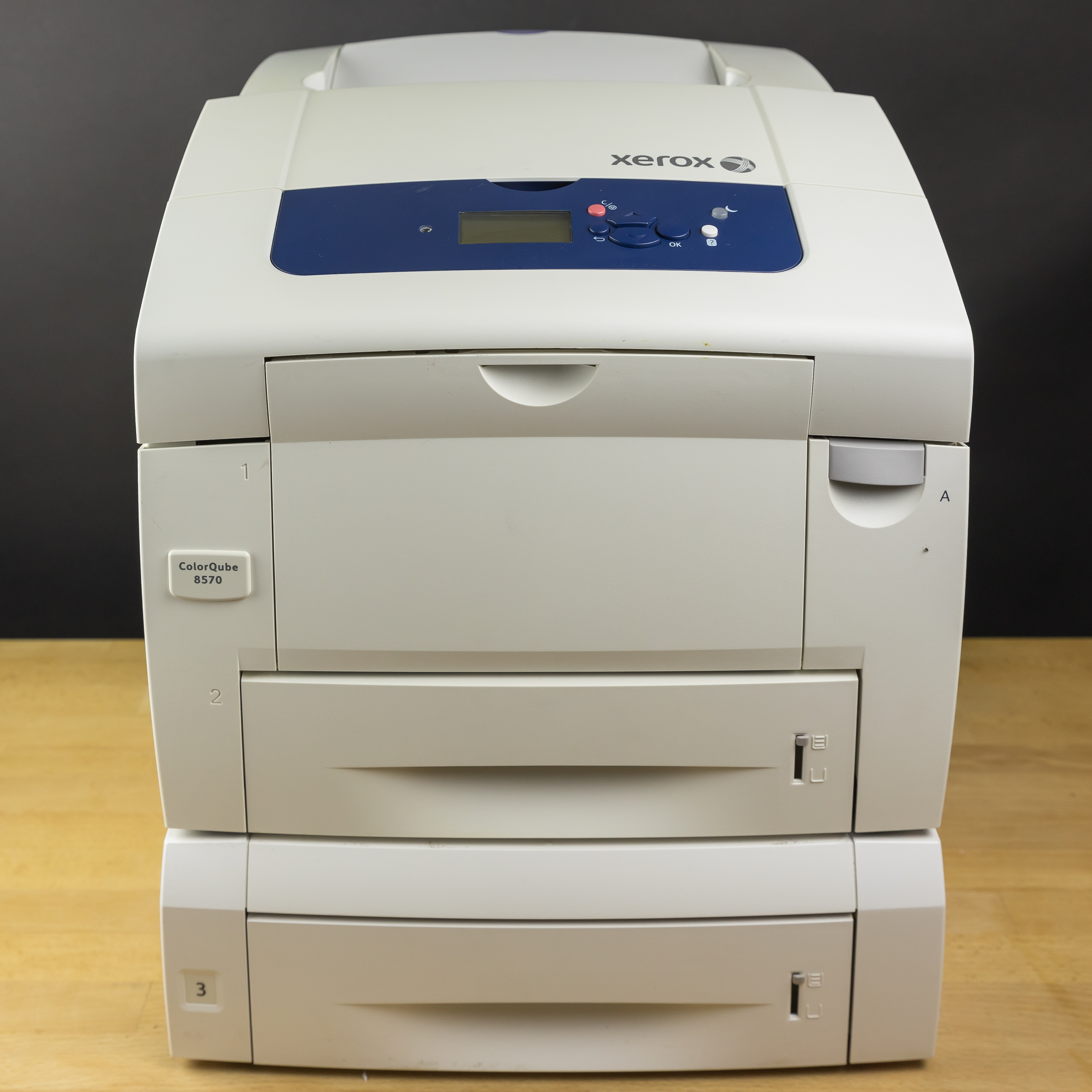
A Xerox ColorQube 8570 solid ink printer

After Xerox acquired the Tektronix Color Printing and Imaging Division in 2000, the solid ink technology became part of the Xerox line of office printing and imaging products. Early offerings focused on the graphic arts industry. However, to forestall a legal battle with Dataproducts Corporation, Tektronix ended up paying royalties to Dataproducts for the use of the technology due to the latter holding patents, purchased from Exxon, on aspects of solid-ink printing. See the reference to the Exxon employees hired by RH Research.

Robert Howard Research introduced the completely different solid ink in 1985 with the HT-1 printer, later named Pixelmaster that shipped in 1986 from Howtek, Inc, Hudson, NH. The Howtek solid ink (called thermoplastic) was molded in 4 different color shapes to fit into the Pixelmaster and later in the Braillemaster printers. This plastic solid ink and the Howtek style single nozzle inkjet were eventually incorporated into two 3D printing products manufactured by Ballistic Particle Manufacturing (BPM) and Sanders Prototype, Inc (SDI) in late 1993. The Howtek inkjet invention, an improved Steve Zoltan style Alpha Jet (originally was glass but Howtek molded nozzles with Tefzeltubular nozzle inkjet operated at 125°C was first developed in 1985 at Howtek and is still in use in Solidscape 3D printers. These inks, inkjets and printers can be seen at the 3Dinkjetmuseum at Layer Grown Model Technology in New Hampshire.

Five previous Exxon employees (Hock, Lutz, Peer and McMahons) who had worked with Exxon inkjet technologies (Exxon sold its patents to Dataproducts in 1984) were hired by RH Research starting in 1983 to develop inkjets and the state of the art printer. In 1985-1966 the Dataproducts patent litigation slowed the development of the printer over solid ink shapes but not over the solid ink formulation. Delays from the litigation and Yen exchange rate changes increased the cost of the Pixelmaster printer and sales dropped of by the late 1980s. At this time, Howtek also expanded into scanner technology to improve imagery for the color printers and also learned of negative image printing, transparency printing, Braille printing and printing digital information on rigid paper printing plates for the newspaper industry. This led to the founding of a new company, Presstek, Inc., in 1986.

Around the first half of 2016, Xerox discontinued selling solid ink printers.
