= Swecoin =

Swecoin AB
- Industry: Computer hardware
- Founded: 1983
- Headquarters: Sollentuna, Sweden
- Key people: Fredrik Hesse, General Manager 2006 - 2009; Tommy Wincent, Managing Director 1999 - 2006
- Products: Printers
- Number of employees: 25
- Website: swecoin.se

Swecoin was a thermal printer manufacturing company based in Sollentuna, Sweden. They also had a US-based sales division, Swecoin US Inc, based in Rhode Island. Swecoin was acquired by Zebra Technologies Corporation in 2006.

Swecoin's printer designs utilize a patented looping presenter mechanism in which a paper loop is formed inside the printer before the printout is presented to the user of the printer to prevent the user from removing the printout before it has completed.

== History ==
The company Swecoin AB was founded in 1983, as a successor to the mechanical cash-register company Sweda. Originally the focus was to sell spare parts and similar for these machines.

The company then branched into importing and distributing Point of Sales printers from manufacturers such as Data Techno.

In the very early 1990s the company started developing its own products, kiosk and ticket printers. Shortly after this a US distribution company, Swecoin US Inc, was founded in Rhode Island.

The company grew organically and through acquisitions during the 1990s. Acquisitions included the component distribution company Promakon, the injection moulding company Nya Ovansjö Plast och Verktyg and the Pay and Display Parking machine manufacturer AB Cale Industi.

In 1997 the Swecoin Group was acquired by Metric Gruppen, owned by Rune Andersson.

In late 1999, some of the original owners bought back the core Swecoin printer business from Metric. The business grew significantly from this point with several new product lines being introduced, for example the TTP 2000 series.

In October 2006 Swecoin was acquired by the Zebra Technologies Corporation, and by the end of 2009 it was fully integrated into Zebra Technologies.

== Technology ==
Throughout its entire history, Swecoin has been at the forefront of kiosk and ticket printer development. Key examples of this include the looping presenter and pull detector for forced paper ejection, as well as the early launch of a USB kiosk printer in 1998. Additionally, they have introduced network connectable ticket printers with magnetic encoding capabilities.

== Products ==
In 2008, the product line consisted of:

- TTP 1000 kiosk printer - 58mm print width
- TTP 2000 kiosk printer - 58 to 82,5mm print width
- TTP 7030 kiosk printer - 80 and 112mm print width
- TTP 8000 kiosk printer - 210 and 216mm print width
- TTP 2100 ticket printer
- TTPM2 ticket printer with magnetic encoding
- TTPM3 ticket printer with magnetic encoding
