= Dataproducts =

Dataproducts Corporation
- Type: Public
- Industry: Computer peripherals
- Founded: 1962
- Founders: Erwin Tomash; Willis K. Drake; Chester Irwin Lappen; Graham Tyson
- Defunct: 1999
- Fate: Acquired by Hitachi in 1990; reorganized into Hitachi Koki Imaging Solutions in 1999
- Successor: Hitachi Koki Imaging Solutions (1999–2002); Hitachi Printing Solutions America (2002–2004); Ricoh Printing Systems America (2004–2005); Clover Technologies Group / Clover Imaging Group (supplies division, 2005–2024); Katun Corporation (supplies brand, 2024–present)
- Headquarters: Woodland Hills, Los Angeles, California, U.S.
- Key people: Erwin Tomash (Chairman & CEO, 1962–1971); Graham Tyson (CEO, 1971–1986); Jack C. Davis (Chairman & CEO, 1986–1990)
- Products: Line printers (drum printers and band printers); Dot matrix printers; Daisy wheel printers; Solid ink printers; Laser printers; Core memory systems; Disk drives; Dataproducts parallel interface
- Parent: Hitachi (1990–1999)
- Subsidiaries: Informatics (spun off 1968); Data Card (spun off c. 1971); Stelma; Staff Dynamics; Uptime

Dataproducts Corporation was an early American manufacturer of computer peripheral equipment, best known for its high-speed line printers and its proprietary Dataproducts parallel interface, which became a de facto industry standard for minicomputer and mainframe printing. Founded in 1962 by Erwin Tomash and partners as a spin-off of Telex's Data Systems Division, the company initially produced disk drives and core memory systems before establishing dominance in the OEM printer market with its voice-coil drum printers and steel-band line printers.

During the late 1970s and 1980s, Dataproducts diversified into dot matrix printers, daisy wheel printers, solid ink systems, and laser printers, while spinning off successful ventures including software developer Informatics General and plastic-card equipment maker Datacard. Following patent litigation and declining earnings in the late 1980s, Dataproducts was acquired by Hitachi in 1990 and reorganized into Hitachi Koki Imaging Solutions in 1999; its imaging supplies division was later acquired by Clover Technologies Group in 2005 and subsequently passed to Katun Corporation in 2024.

== History ==
=== 1962–1971: Founding and early growth ===
Initially known as Data Products, the company was founded in 1962 by Erwin Tomash—alongside co-founders Willis K. Drake, Chester Irwin Lappen, and Graham Tyson—to acquire a controlling interest in Telex's Data Systems Division. Telex had previously spun off the unit from Midwestern Instruments, and the division had fallen behind on a contract to deliver disk drives to General Electric. Dataproducts resolved the engineering bottlenecks, completed the product, and delivered disk drives to General Electric as well as Ferranti, ICL, and RCA.

Sustained by revenue from its disk drive business and its contract software subsidiary, Informatics (headed by Walter F. Bauer), Data Products began developing its first line printer. Introduced in 1963, the Model 3300 was a 300-line-per-minute drum printer that utilized an electromagnetically operated moving coil (voice coil) actuator redesigned by engineer Clifford Helms. Unlike competing printers from manufacturers such as ANelex—which relied on mechanical solenoids and clutches requiring frequent field adjustment—the friction-free voice coil hammer mechanism gave Dataproducts a major reliability and maintenance advantage in the independent OEM printer market.

In 1966, core memory systems were added to the product line. Driven by heightened sales and earnings, Data Products relocated its headquarters to a new facility in Woodland Hills, Los Angeles, California, in 1968. During this period, the company also spun off Informatics as a public corporation and expanded through acquisitions, purchasing businesses including Staff Dynamics, a personnel agency, and Uptime, a manufacturer of punched card readers.

=== 1971–1986: Product diversification and solid ink litigation ===
Co-founder Graham Tyson succeeded Tomash as CEO in 1971. Around this time, Dataproducts' disk drive business struggled against intensifying competition from IBM-compatible storage manufacturers and was eventually discontinued. Meanwhile, the company spun off Data Card (later Datacard), led by co-founder Willis Drake, to manufacture plastic card embossing and encoding equipment, and acquired the telecommunications firm Stelma.

By the late 1970s, Dataproducts transitioned its core line printer offerings from drum technology to steel-band mechanisms (such as the B-300 and B-600 series) and broadened its portfolio to include dot matrix printers as well as thermal printers sourced from Olivetti. In 1978, daisy wheel printers were added to the product line through the acquisition of Plessey's printer division.

A joint development project with Exxon yielded a series of solid ink printers. Six engineers from Exxon's printer unit, the Danbury Systems Division, were subsequently hired by Howtek, Inc., which developed the Pixelmaster Solid Ink Color printer. Dataproducts sued Howtek over patent infringement regarding hot-melt ink. Although Dataproducts eventually dropped the lawsuit, the litigation delayed shipment of the Howtek Pixelmaster by roughly two years (until 1986) and increased its manufacturing costs at a time when Howtek was in negotiations with Apple over the color printer. Prolonged patent battles with Tektronix and Apple over solid ink technology drained company resources, ultimately ending with Apple discontinuing its product and Tektronix agreeing to pay royalties.

=== 1986–1999: Restructuring and Hitachi acquisition ===
In May 1986, Jack C. Davis, 47, a former Harris Corporation senior vice president, replaced Graham Tyson as chairman and chief executive officer. To enter the non-impact page printer market, Dataproducts used Toshiba print engines for its first laser printers in 1989. However, by 1989, net income had fallen from a peak of $27.7 million to $3.8 million, and the company faced hostile takeover attempts by a shareholder consortium.

In 1990, Dataproducts was acquired by Hitachi Koki Co., Ltd., a subsidiary of Hitachi, and integrated with Hitachi Koki's Printing Systems Group. Operating as a Hitachi subsidiary, Dataproducts later utilized Fuji Xerox engines for its Typhoon series of high-resolution laser printers; the LZR 1560/1580 models were OEMed by Apple as the LaserWriter Pro 810 in 1993. In February 1998, the company introduced the LZR 5200 wide-format continuous-feed laser printer for mid-range production printing.

The Dataproducts corporate name remained in use until April 1999, when the business was reorganized into Hitachi Koki Imaging Solutions, Inc. (later merged into Hitachi Printing Solutions America in 2002 and subsequently acquired by Ricoh).

=== 2005–present: Clover Imaging and Katun brand continuation ===
Effective February 1, 2005, Clover Technologies Group, LLC (later Clover Imaging Group) of Ottawa, Illinois, acquired the North American and European compatible printing supplies divisions of Ricoh Printing Systems America, Inc. (RPSA), which manufactured Dataproducts-branded and other aftermarket imaging consumables. Clover established Dataproducts USA, LLC as a dedicated subsidiary to market remanufactured and compatible toner cartridges, inkjet supplies, and printer ribbons under the Dataproducts name.

Following Clover Technologies Group's December 2019 Chapter 11 reorganization and subsequent 2020 separation from Clover Wireless, the imaging supplies business operated independently as Clover Imaging Group, continuing to license and manufacture Dataproducts-branded consumables. In August 2024, Clover Imaging Group sold its North American remanufactured and compatible supplies business—including the Dataproducts brand portfolio—to Katun Corporation (a subsidiary of General Plastic Industrial Co., Ltd.).

== Products and technology ==
Throughout its history, Dataproducts transitioned across several generations of impact and non-impact printing architectures, primarily supplying OEM computer builders as well as the end-user data center market.

== Informatics ==
When Dataproducts was first formed, Informatics was created as a contract software subsidiary headed by Walter F. Bauer. In 1964, Informatics acquired Advanced Information Systems (AIS) from Hughes Dynamics. The AIS file management system led to MARK IV, a fourth-generation programming language that became the first software product to reach $10 million—and later $100 million—in cumulative sales. Dataproducts spun Informatics off as a public corporation in 1968. Beginning in 1983, Sterling Software made an unsolicited acquisition offer that escalated into a takeover attempt and culminated in a merger in 1985.
