= Printronix =

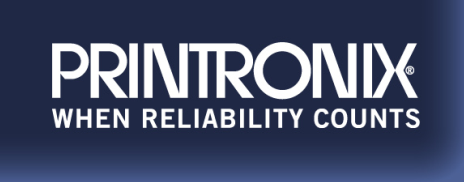
- Type: Private
- Industry: Manufacturing
- Founded: (1974)
- Headquarters: Irvine, California
- Key people: Marlon Woolforde, CEO
- Products: Industrial print solutions
- Number of employees: 600 worldwide
- Website: http://printronix.com

Printronix is an American supplier of industrial print solutions, industrial laser printers, and line and dot matrix printers. Printronix is based in Irvine, California, and operates across 14 offices worldwide.

== Products ==
Printronix's printers are primarily used in industrial environments for printing high-volume labels, bar-codes, invoices, manifest and bill of lading documents, delivery sheets, reports, build/broadcast sheets, green bar and bank statements.

PrintNet Enterprise Suite (PNE), a web-based application allowing administrators to network and manage all Printronix line-matrix printers from a single computer, was launched in 2007.

Printronix also offers consumables, parts, accessories, service and software.

== History ==
Printronix was founded in 1974 by Robert A. Kleist and business partners Gordon B. Barrus and David Mayne.

Barrus realized there was a capital need for businesses to store all their data via printing, so he quit his job at Data Products and started a company he named Eikon, marketing industrial-grade printers to businesses to fulfill this need. The company was not successful and Gordon regrouped to found the startup Printronix. In the spring of 1974, in a garage in Playa del Rey, California, seven high technology pioneers got together and started a new company. They were Gordon Barrus (RIP), Leo Emenaker (RIP), Robert A Kleist, Dave Mayne, Ray Melissa, Rafael Patiño and Glen Radke (RIP). Initially working out of Leo Emenaker's garage in Playa Del Rey, California, Barrus developed and invented what he christened as the P300, a 300-line-per-minute (LPM) prototype line printer series.

The company would eventually incorporate, go public on the Nasdaq, and experience great success in the ensuing years with the emergence of the personal computer.

- 1976: Printronix goes Public and trades on the Nasdaq
- 1981: Opens Holland manufacturing facility and expands global operations to Europe, Middle-East and Africa
- 1985: Operations expand into Asia-Pacific with the opening of the Singapore Facility
- 1995: Printronix enters the Indian Market and signs agreement with Wipro
- 1998: Expansion into the China Market
- 2001: Printronix acquires RJS and enters the scanner/ verifier market
- 2008: Acquired by Vector Capital, Printronix becomes a Private Company
- 2009: Printronix acquires TallyGenicom
- 2013: Corona Investments acquires Printronix
