= Tektronix Phaser 740 =

The Tektronix Phaser 740, released in October 1998, was a series of color laser printers sold by Tektronix's printer division, now a part of Xerox. The Phaser 740 is notable for being the industry's first true 1200×1200 dpi color laser printer. The printer was available in several different configurations, from the 740L ($1499 MSRP, only black toner included) to the fully tricked out 740 Extended (128 MiB RAM, duplexing, hard drive, etc.). The "plus" feature set was required for 1200×1200 color printing. Standard features included 10BASE-T Ethernet, LPT connectivity, SCSI connectivity, an expansion port for other networking options, 133 MHz PowerPC CPU, and PostScript. Network protocols included Telnet, FTP, AppSocket, IPP, HTTP, and AppleTalk. One upgraded the lowest model to the Extended functionality by adding components. A notable feature of this printer is its ability to accept PDF files directly, through FTP or Telnet. The onboard computer would then process the PDF to PS and print it. Phaser 740 series printers required little maintenance compared to other printers of the time. The only consumables were toner, fuser, imaging drum, and transfer roller.
