= M. J. Murdock Charitable Trust =

Charitable trust based in Vancouver, Washington

- Named after: Melvin Jack Murdock
- Established: 1975
- Legal status: Charitable organization
- Headquarters: Vancouver, Washington, U.S.
- Region served: Pacific Northwest
- Executive director: Romanita Hairston
- Key people: Jeff Grubb; Jeff Pinneo; John Castles (Trustees)
- Main organ: Board of Trustees
- Disbursements: US$ 66.3 million (year total, 2019); US$ 1 billion (cumulative total, as of 2019)
- Endowment: $80 million USD (91 million by 1975) (1971)
- Website: www.murdocktrust.org

The M. J. Murdock Charitable Trust is a private, non-profit foundation based in Vancouver, Washington, United States.

== History ==
Following the 1971 death of Tektronix co-founder Melvin Jack Murdock, $90 million from his estate was transferred to a charitable foundation which, in 1975, became the M. J. Murdock Charitable Trust. The Trust was initially overseen by Tektronix General Counsel James B. Castles, attorney Paul L. Boley, and Walter P. Dyke as trustees, with Sam C. Smith appointed as its first CEO.

The Trust is led by executive director Romanita Hairston and a board of three trustees: Jeff Grubb, Jeff Pinneo, and John W. Castles (son of James B. Castles).

== Activities ==
Based in Vancouver, Washington, the trust funds grant-making for projects in the areas of scientific research, arts and culture, education, health and human service needs for non-profits operating in the Pacific Northwest — specifically Alaska, Idaho, Montana, Oregon, Washington and British Columbia. In response to the COVID-19 pandemic, the Murdock Trust expanded its grant-making to include emergency support for non-profit organizations utilizing an abridged application. The trust organizes training and educational programs for educators, students and non-profit professionals, and works to further an expansion of opportunities for collaboration through the convening of groups to discuss various issues and challenges.

The Murdock Trust's funding priorities were criticized in 2016 for its donations to political organizations, specifically, the $975,000 given to the Alliance Defending Freedom, including $375,000 in 2016. The Alliance Defending Freedom has been described as an anti-LGBTQ organization and was designated a hate group in February 2017 by the Southern Poverty Law Center. Murdock trustee Jeff Grubb responded to this criticism by stating that "the Murdock Trust does not give money to anti-gay or anti-women groups." The Murdock Trust faced additional scrutiny from philanthropy oversight organizations for their $240,000 donation in 2015 to the Freedom Foundation, a group based in Olympia, Washington that seeks to "bankrupt and defeat" government employees' labor unions, according to one of their fundraising letters.
