= Tektronix analog oscilloscopes =

Series of oscilloscopes manufactured by Tektronix

Tektronix was founded in the mid-1940s to produce oscilloscopes. This list of analog oscilloscopes attempts to present all oscilloscopes made by Tektronix from the 1950s to the 1990s, including technical data and accessories.

== 400 series ==
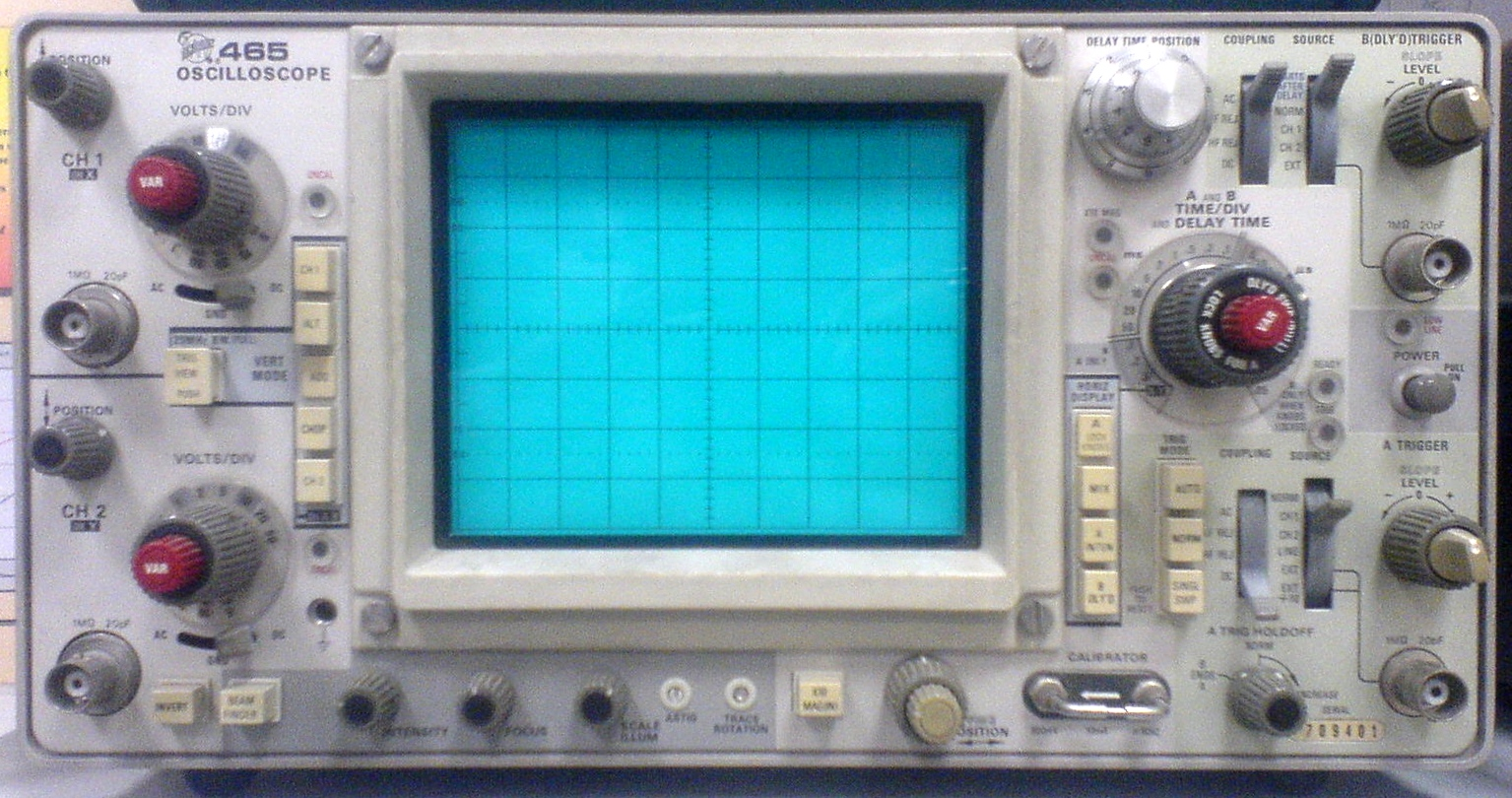
A Tektronix 465 portable analog oscilloscope is a typical instrument of the late 1970s.

In the 1960s, Tektronix introduced the relatively compact 450 series of portable oscilloscopes, starting with the 50 MHz 453. The 453 was superseded by the 454. In addition, Tektronix also made the 15 MHz 422 AC/DC portable.

The 450 series was succeeded by the 460, 470, and 480 series. Each new model offered increased bandwidth and improved triggering. However, these oscilloscopes remained too heavy for portable use, and their chassis were complex and costly to manufacture.

The 400 series oscilloscopes were notable for their wide variety of optional choices. For example, the available bandwidth ranged from 500 kHz to 400 MHz.

In 1988, prices for the most basic models were approximately $2,000, whereas more advanced models like the 2467 with microchannel plate cathode ray tube (MCP CRT) could be more than $12,000.

== 500 series ==
=== 501 oscilloscope ===
The first digit in this model's number, '5', represents the diameter of the device screen. Compared to competing products from Dumont, RCA, and Varian, the 501 was large in size and weight.

=== 511 oscilloscope ===
The 511 was introduced to address the size and weight of the 501. This model was designed by Howard Vollum, Milt Bave, and others.

=== 515A oscilloscope ===
The Tektronix 515 was a 15 MHz single-trace, all-tube oscilloscope introduced in 1955. After the first 900 units were manufactured, the model was updated and given the '500A' moniker.

The 515A provided two vertical inputs. Using a selector switch, the signal of one of the vertical inputs could be displayed as a function of time. Additionally, the 515A provided a horizontal input. The signal of the horizontal input could be combined with the signal of one of the vertical inputs and displayed as an x-y plot.

=== 547 oscilloscope ===
The 547 was a single beam, dual trace, vacuum tube type oscilloscope introduced in 1968 at the cost of $1,875. It was popular mainly because of its "ALT" mode, which allowed for dual traces to be shown on a single beam oscilloscope, providing much of the functionality of dual beam scopes for a fraction of the cost.

The 547 achieved this through an electronic switch, in front of the vertical system, that could display two separate electrical signals on the screen. This required only a few parts of the oscilloscope to be duplicated in the device and therefore increased the cost by only a small amount. This technique was also used in all dual and four-trace plug-ins such as the CA, 1A1, 1A2, Type M, and 1A4.

== 2000 series ==
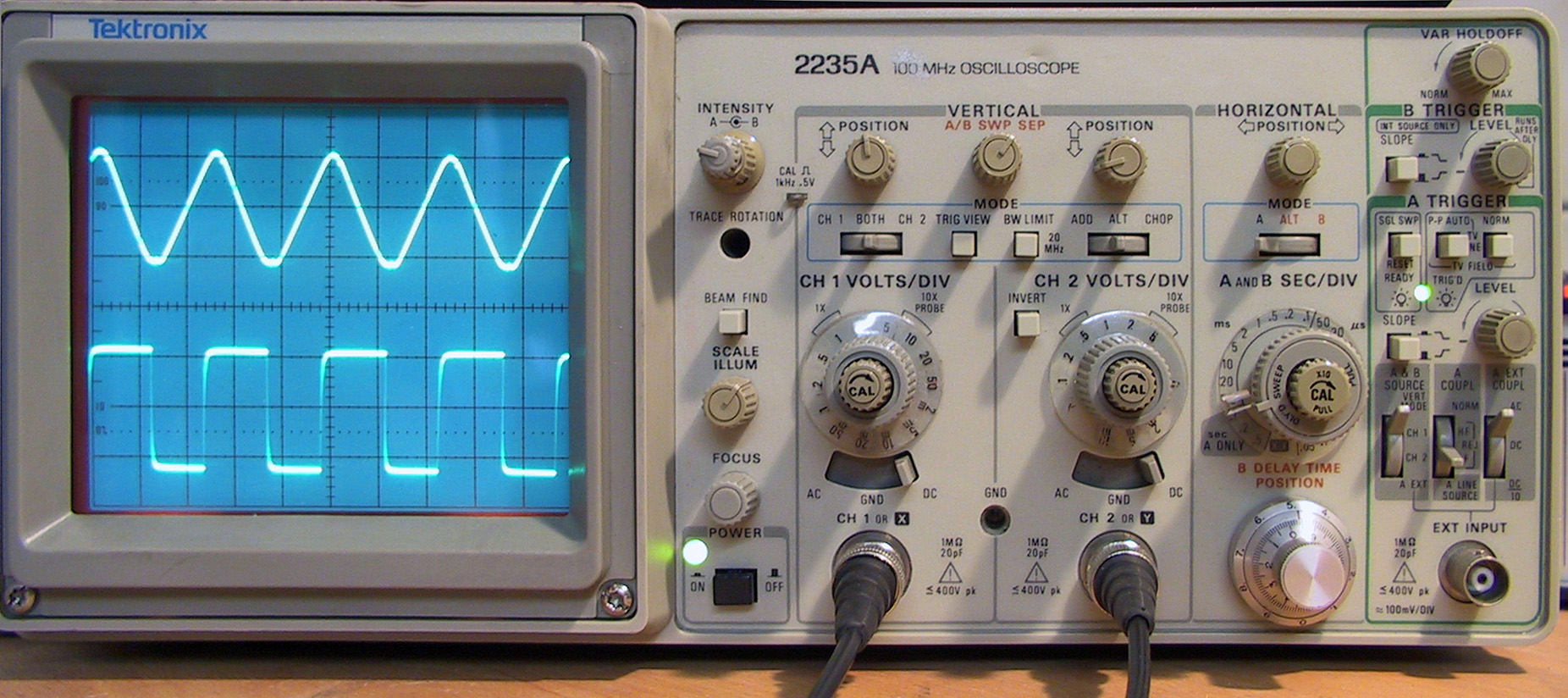
Tektronix 2235A

The first 2000 series Tektronix portable oscilloscopes, which were introduced in the 1982 catalog, were the 2213, 2215, 2335, 2336, and 2337. They could withstand impacts of up to 50g, which was an improvement over the 500 series. This was achieved mainly through simplification of circuit design and a lightweight switching power supply. They were significantly lighter than the 400 series.

The 2200 series models had a bandwidth ranging from 20 MHz up to 100 MHz. The 2400 series started at 150 MHz (2445, 2445A), increasing with the 2445B; 150 MHz for early units, 200 MHz for later units. The 2465 had a bandwidth of 300 MHz, with triggering to match, the 2465A had 350 MHz and the 2465B had 400 MHz, with triggering beyond 500 MHz.

Both the 2445 and the 2465 were microprocessor-driven and firmware-controlled, as opposed to the 2200 and 2300 models.

The 2200 series was mostly 2-channel, with the 2245, 2246, 2247 and 2252 being the 4-channel exceptions (the two extra channels having only two vertical attenuation values). The 2247 and 2252 were very similar, the only difference being that 2252 had printing features and programmable setups.

The 2335 and 2336 were 2-channel, ruggedized versions, intended for military applications.

The 2400 series was 4-channel, with 2 of the channels having full attenuators. The 2467 was an unconventional model, because it had a micro-channel plate (MCP) CRT. This enabled extremely high speed writing and making one-shot pulses at nanosecond duration, visible in normal room light. It was the only non-storage CRT with this capability. The same type of CRT was also used in the 7104 model.

Oscilloscopes with cursors include the 2211, 2246, 2252, and all of the 2400 series (2445, 2465, 2467). Cursors allow measurements that are independent of the graticule. With a cursor-equipped scope, the user can accurately and quickly measure, as a minimum, voltage, time, and frequency of all or parts of the waveform. Accuracy varies, but even the most basic cursors provide more accurate results than taking readings from the graticule. The 2445, 2465, and 2467 models had an option called CTT, which links a highly accurate frequency counter with the cursor and readout system.

=== Year of introduction ===
According to the Tektronix catalogs, the following models were introduced in the following years:

- 1982: 2213, 2215, 2335, 2336, 2337 (first models)
- 1983: (no new models)
- 1984: 2235, 2236, 2445, 2465
- 1985: 2213A, 2215A, 2235L, 2236/01, 2465CTS, 2465DMS, 2465DVS
- 1986: 2220, 2230, 2430
- 1987: 2225, 2245, 2246, 2430M, 2445A, 2455A, 2465A, 2465A-CT, -DM and -DV, 2467
- 1988: 2235/01, 2246/1Y, 2430A
- 1989: 2201, 2205, 2210, 2245A, 2246A, 2246/1Y, 2247A, 2402, 2432A, 2440, 2465B, 2445B, 2465BCT, 2465BDM, 2465BDV, 2467B
- 1990: 2211, 2232, 2235A, 2235A/01, 2235L, 2236A, 2431L
- 1991: 2221A, 2252, 2402A, 2439, 2467BHD

The 2000 series reached its peak circa 1984, with as many as 21 models introduced and a total of 33 models offered. No new 2000 series models were released after 1994. By 1996, only the 2430A, 2440, 2465B, and 2467B were offered. When Tektronix published its 1997 catalog, it did not list any 2000 series models, marking the end of a 14 year production run.

== 2400 series ==
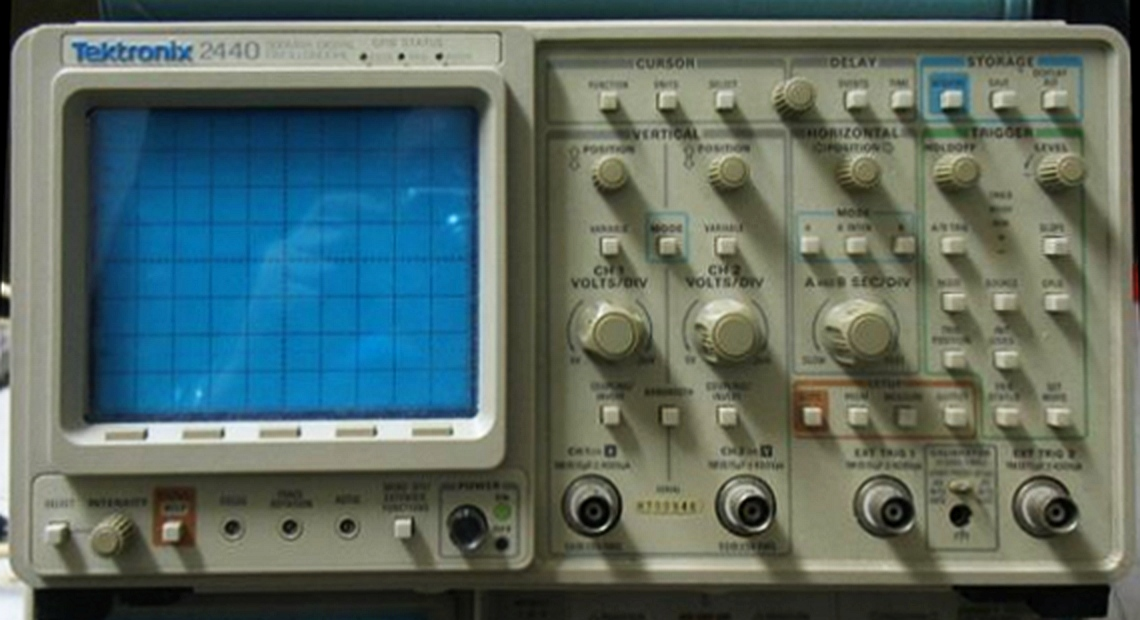
One of the digital storage oscilloscopes of the 2400 series, which featured both conventional analog and digital models, was the 2440 with a sampling rate of 500 MS/sec and bandwidth of 300 MHz.

The Tektronix 2400 series oscilloscopes were perhaps the most powerful instruments of their time, with the 2445, 2465 and 2467 being the top-end models, and the 2430 series providing digital storage. They combined high bandwidth and sampling rates with automation features and waveform processing capabilities. In 1991, four models were available: the 2430A, 2431L, 2432A and 2440.

The combination of a 2400 series oscilloscope, a TekMate 2402(A) instrument extension and a PC, constituted a complete waveform processing and analysis system.

The probe that was supplied with an 2400 series oscilloscope was the P6137, which provided 10X attenuation, 400 MHz bandwidth with readout capability and auto setup activation.

=== Models ===
- 2430A – sampling rate 100 MS/sec, bandwidth 150 MHz
- 2431L – sampling rate 250 MS/sec, bandwidth 300 MHz (no delay sweep, no glitch capture, limited AUTO SETUP)
- 2432A – sampling rate 250 MS/sec, bandwidth 300 MHz
- 2439 – sampling rate 500 MS/sec, bandwidth 300 MHz (no delay sweep, no glitch capture, limited AUTO SETUP)
- 2440 – sampling rate 500 MS/sec, bandwidth 300 MHz
- 2445 – analog scope, bandwidth 150 MHz
- 2445B – analog scope, bandwidth 150 MHz
- 2455B – analog scope, bandwidth 250 MHz
- 2465 – analog scope, bandwidth 300 MHz
- 2465A – analog scope, bandwidth 350 MHz
- 2465B – analog scope, bandwidth 400 MHz
- 2467 – analog scope, bandwidth 350 MHz
- 2467B – analog scope, bandwidth 400 MHz

=== Options ===
- 01 – Digital multimeter
- 03 – Word Recognizer Probe Pod (P6407)
- 05 – Video Waveform Measurement System
- 06 – Counter/Timer/Trigger (CTT)
- 09 – Counter/Timer/Trigger (CTT) with Word Recognizer (WR)
- 10 – GPIB interface
- 11 – Probe power
- 1E – External clock
- 22 – Two additional probes
- 1R – Prep for rack mounting kit

=== TekMate 2402 and 2402A ===
The 2402 TekMate instrument extension was really an IBM clone computer that used the oscilloscope as both keyboard and monitor. The 2402 had two floppy drives; the 2402A provided the option to swap the second floppy drive for a hard drive. The 2402 communicated with the scope over the GPIB bus and would transfer waveform data, programs and front panel setups in both directions. Waveforms could be stored on floppy disks, processed by software in the 2402, and reloaded into the scope for display. Apart from hard disk capacity, there was no limit to the number of waveforms that could be stored.

The processor in the 2402 was an Ampro LittleBoard/PC motherboard running the NEC V40 CPU at 7.16 MHz. The motherboard in the 2402A was an Ampro LittleBoard/286 with a processor running at 16 MHz. Both models had 1 MB of RAM.

The 2402(A) did not need a keyboard. All functions could be executed from menus on the connected oscilloscope. For convenience however, the 2402 provided a connector for a standard IBM PC/XT keyboard. The 2402A provided a connector for a PC/AT keyboard.

The 2402 had a 9-pin female CGA connector. The 2402A had an EGA card.

=== Plotters and printers ===
==== HC100 Color Plotter ====
The HC100 was a four-color plotter designed to make waveform plots directly from the Tektronix 2430-series oscilloscopes. It did not require an intervening controller, commands could be passed to the HC100 by connecting it to the oscilloscope via a GPIB cable. The HC100 could be used to plot digitally stored waveforms and printouts of instrument setup information.

==== HC200 Dot Matrix Printer ====
The HC200 could be used to produce waveform plots as well as capture setup information. It could be attached directly to the oscilloscope with a printer cable, a GPIB interface was not required.

== 7000 series ==
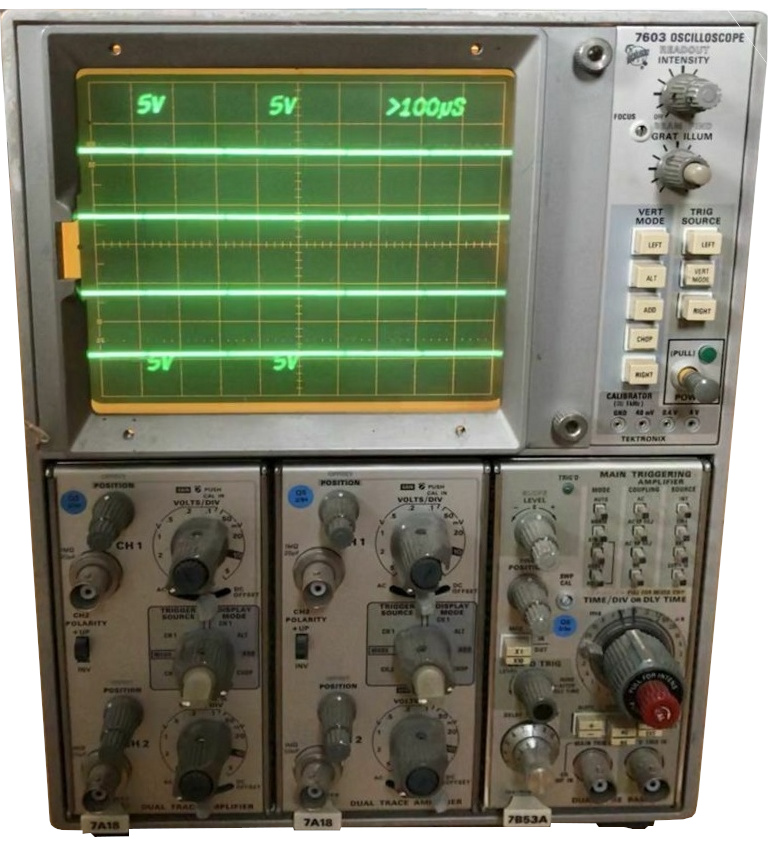
One of the basic models of the 7000 series was the Tektronix 7603 with single beam and three plug-in slots

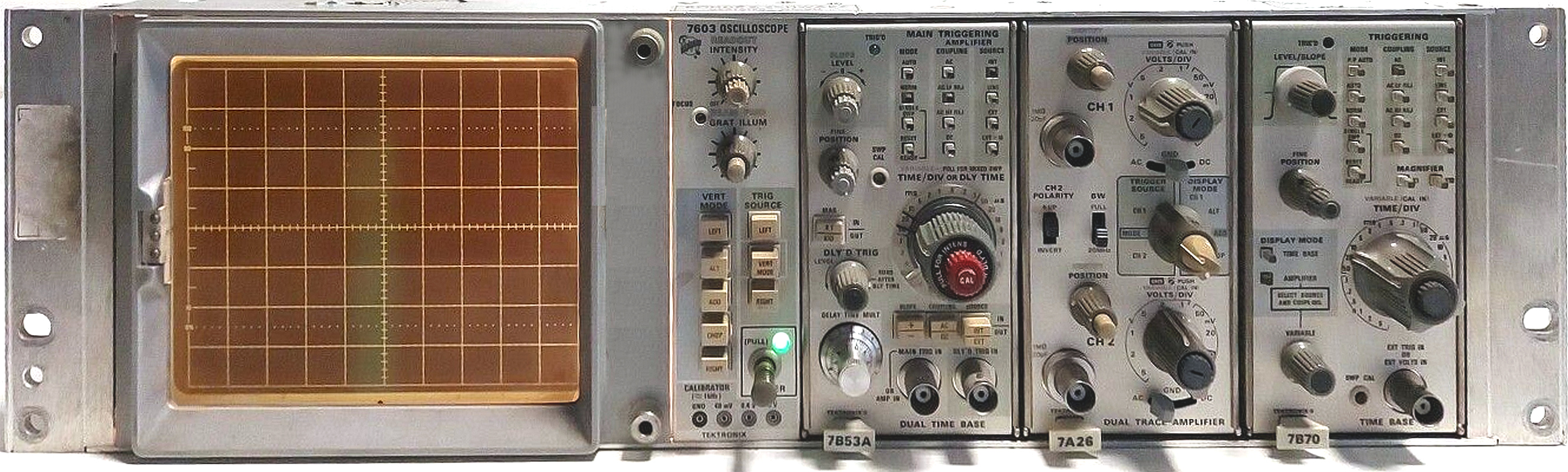
The model 7603 in a rare version for mounting in a 19-inch rack with an amber-coloured screen

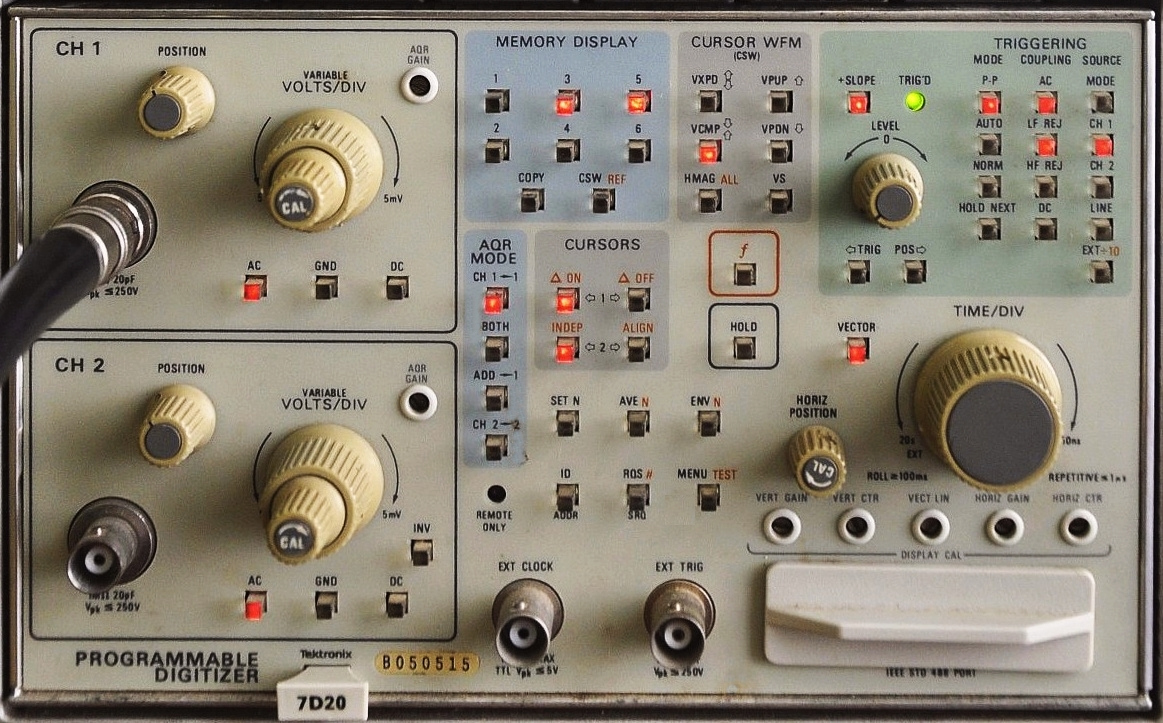
The Programmable Digitizer plug-in 7D20 from 1982 for the 7000 series models took up all three module plug-in slots. It had a special ADC design allowing capture of single-shot events at 40 MSample/s and storage of waveforms, thus turning an analog oscilloscope into a digital storage oscilloscope. It had a GPIB interface for programming and was controlled by a Motorola 68B09 microprocessor.

The 7000 series, a high-end modular oscilloscope family, was introduced in August 1969 and remained in production into the early 1990s. The series included a digital readout system designed by Barrie Gilbert that displayed plug-in settings directly on the CRT, using custom analog-ROM integrated circuits—the first such system in commercially available oscilloscopes. At launch, Tektronix controlled approximately 75% of the global oscilloscope market, and the 7000 series became ubiquitous in electronics laboratories throughout the 1970s and 1980s.

=== Mainframe models ===
The last digit of most model numbers indicated the number of plug-in slots on the mainframe. Initial models launched in August 1969 included the 7504 (90 MHz, 4 slots) and 7704 (150 MHz, 4 slots). The 7704 was notable as the first Tektronix laboratory oscilloscope to employ a switch-mode power supply.

Common single-beam oscilloscope models included the 7603 (100 MHz, 3 slots, $2,700 in 1983), 7704A (200-250 MHz, 4 slots, $4,260 in 1983), 7904 (500 MHz, 4 slots, $8,910 in 1983), 7904A (500 MHz IC-based redesign introduced in 1984), and 7104 (1 GHz, 4 slots, $20,160 in 1983). The 7104, introduced in 1978, used micro-channel plate CRT technology for high-brightness, single-shot event capture and represented the highest bandwidth analog oscilloscope ever built by Tektronix. The 7844 ($12,665 in 1983) was a dual-beam 400 MHz oscilloscope.

Storage oscilloscope models included the 7613 (100 MHz variable persistence with 60-minute view time, $5,025 in 1983), 7623 (100 MHz multimode storage), 7633 (100 MHz with >1000 cm/μs stored writing speed, $7,765 in 1983), 7834 (400 MHz, $11,705 in 1983), and 7934 (500 MHz transfer storage, introduced 1987). The 7834 won the IR-100 Award in 1977 as one of the year's top 100 technical innovations. The 7934 was the fastest analog storage oscilloscope ever built by any manufacturer.

The series also overlapped into digital oscilloscope territory. The 7854 waveform processing oscilloscope ($13,750 in 1983), introduced in 1980, was the first microprocessor-based oscilloscope by any manufacturer, using a Texas Instruments TMS9900 16-bit processor. It could function as both an analog and digital oscilloscope, with GPIB interface, and store up to 40 waveforms. The 7612D programmable waveform digitizer ($26,400 in 1983) and the 7912AD programmable transient waveform digitizer ($24,800 in 1983) were GPIB digitizers without displays.

=== Plug-ins ===
The 7000 series featured an extensive collection of interchangeable plug-ins using a standardized backplane interface. Plug-ins could be swapped between different 7000-series mainframes without recalibration.

==== Amplifier plug-ins (7Ann) ====
The 7A18A was a 75 MHz, 1 MΩ, 5 mV/div dual-trace amplifier ($1,180 in 1983). The 7A26 dual-trace amplifier (200 MHz, $1,910 in 1983) was the most successful 7000-series plug-in with over 120,000 units produced. The 7A29 ($2,530 in 1983) was a 1 GHz, 50-ohm single-channel amplifier designed for the 7104 oscilloscope.

Differential amplifiers included the 7A22 (1 MHz bandwidth with 10 μV/div sensitivity, $1,500 in 1983) and the 7A13 differential comparator (100 MHz, $2,865 in 1983). The 7A13 could subtract a DC voltage from the input and amplify around that voltage, enabling detailed examination of voltage rails—for example, subtracting a nominal 1.1V core voltage and setting the amplifier to 1 mV/div to observe power supply quality in detail.

Other amplifier plug-ins included the 7A19 (500 MHz single-channel, designed for the 7904) and the 7A16A (225 MHz single-channel with 1 MΩ input).

==== Time base plug-ins (7Bnn) ====
Time base plug-ins matched the mainframe's bandwidth capabilities. Two time base plug-ins could communicate to obtain a delayed sweep feature, such as the 7B80 and 7B85 ($1,335 and $1,605 in 1983). The 7B85, introduced in 1976, was the first timebase with "delta delay" (dual differential delay) and included a digital voltmeter to measure delay time differences. Some time base plug-ins included a delayed sweep in one module, such as the 7B53A ($1,430 in 1983) or 7B92A (500 MHz dual timebase, $3,175 in 1983).

==== Digital and meter plug-ins (7Dnn) ====
The 7D11 ($2,915 in 1983) was a digital delay, the 7D15 ($3,020 in 1983) was a 225 MHz counter/timer with eight measurement modes, the 7D13 ($1,105 in 1983) was a 3 1/2-digit multimeter with galvanically isolated input, and the 7D12 ($2,815 in 1983 with M2 module) had sample-and-hold capability with an analog-to-digital converter accepting M1, M2, or M3 plug-in modules.

The 7D01 and 7D02 were logic analyzer plug-ins that used the mainframe as a display. The triple-wide 7D20 programmable digitizer with GPIB ($7,750 in 1983) turned an analog mainframe into a digital storage oscilloscope.

==== Sampling technology plug-ins ====
Many sampling plug-ins used S-series sampling and pulse generator heads compatible with earlier Tektronix 560-series sampling plug-ins. The 7S11 sampling unit ($1,780 in 1983) accepted one S-series head in a mainframe's vertical slot. The S-1 sampling head ($1,160 in 1983) provided 1 GHz bandwidth, while the S-4 sampling head ($2,665 in 1983) was a 12.4 GHz traveling-wave sampler with 25 ps rise time.

The 7S11 worked with the 7T11 ($4,460 in 1983) or 7T11A sampling sweep units as a time base. The 7T11 could trigger on 1 GHz signals or synchronize to 1-12.4 GHz inputs using tunnel diode circuits. The 7S12 TDR/Sampler ($3,390 in 1983) was a double-wide time domain reflectometry plug-in, requiring both a sampling head (such as the S-6 30 ps rise time 11.5 GHz pass-through sampler, $2,295 in 1983) and pulse generator (such as the S-52 25 ps rise time tunnel diode generator, $1,655 in 1983). The 7S14 dual-trace delayed sweep sampler ($5,235 in 1983) was a complete 1 GHz sampler not requiring separate S-series heads.

==== Other plug-ins ====
The 7CT1N ($1,385 in 1983) was a curve tracer plug-in for testing small-signal transistors and FETs up to 0.5 watts. Spectrum analyzer plug-ins included the 7L5, 7L12, 7L13, 7L14, and 7L18. Combining a 7000-series storage oscilloscope mainframe with a non-storage spectrum analyzer plug-in (7L12, 7L13) allowed slow sweeps with displays that did not fade. The 7L5, 7L14, and 7L18 had internal digital storage and could show stable displays even in non-storage mainframes.

== GPIB bus ==
In 1965, Hewlett-Packard designed the Hewlett-Packard Interface Bus (HP-IB) to connect their line of programmable instruments to their computers. It had a high transfer rate for its time (nominally 1 MB/s), which made it popular with other manufacturers as well. It was eventually accepted as IEEE Standard 488–1975, with a later upgrade to ANSI/IEEE Standard 488.1-1987. ANSI/IEEE 488.2-1987 added further improvements in the form of precise definitions of controller - instrument communication. Today, the name General Purpose Interface Bus (GPIB) is more widely used than HP-IB.

Using the command structures defined in IEEE 488.2 as a base, Standard Commands for Programmable Instruments (SCPI) created a single, comprehensive, programming command set, compatible with any SCPI instrument.

Many Tektronix instruments, including the 2430-series oscilloscopes, are available with GPIB interface cards.
