= Royer oscillator =

Electronic circuit

A Royer oscillator is an electronic relaxation oscillator that employs a saturable-core transformer in the main power path. It was invented and patented in April 1954 by Richard L. Bright & George H. Royer, who are listed as co-inventors on the patent. It has the advantages of simplicity, low component count, rectangle waveforms, and transformer isolation. As well as being an inverter, it can be used as a galvanically-isolated DC-DC converter when the transformer output winding is connected to a suitable rectifying stage, in which case the resulting apparatus is usually called a "Royer Converter".

It has some disadvantages, the most notable being that its output voltage (both amplitude and frequency thereof) is strongly dependent on the input voltage, and this cannot be overcome without significant changes to the original design as patented by Royer. The other disadvantage is that the power loss in the transformer can be very significant since it must operate at its maximum (saturating) magnetic flux density at the design frequency. Hence, the transformer is a critical component of the Royer inverter which has an impact on (a) its function (the amplitude & frequency of the output voltage), and (b) how well it performs that function (overall efficiency).

== Description ==
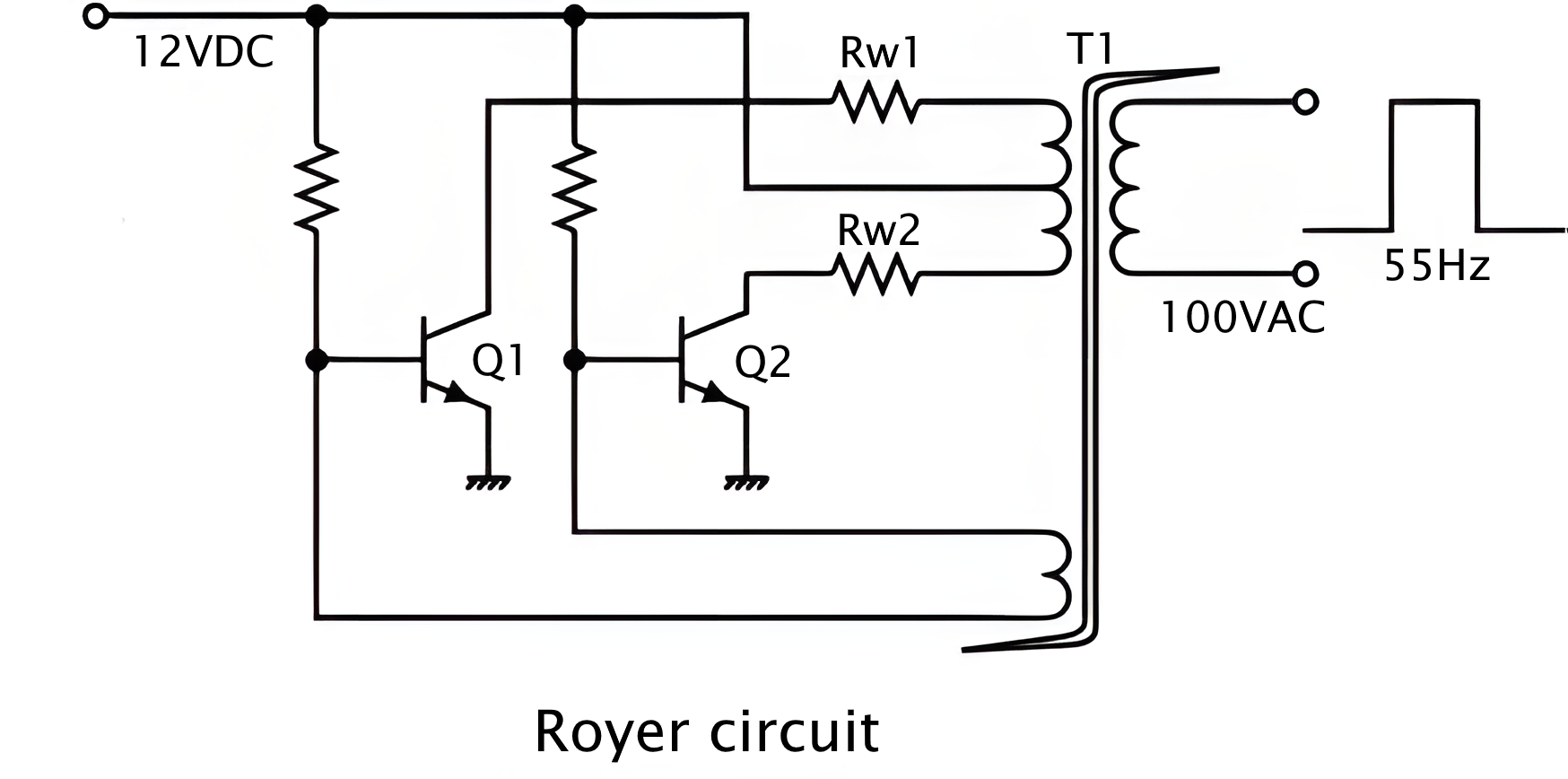
Royer oscillator circuit

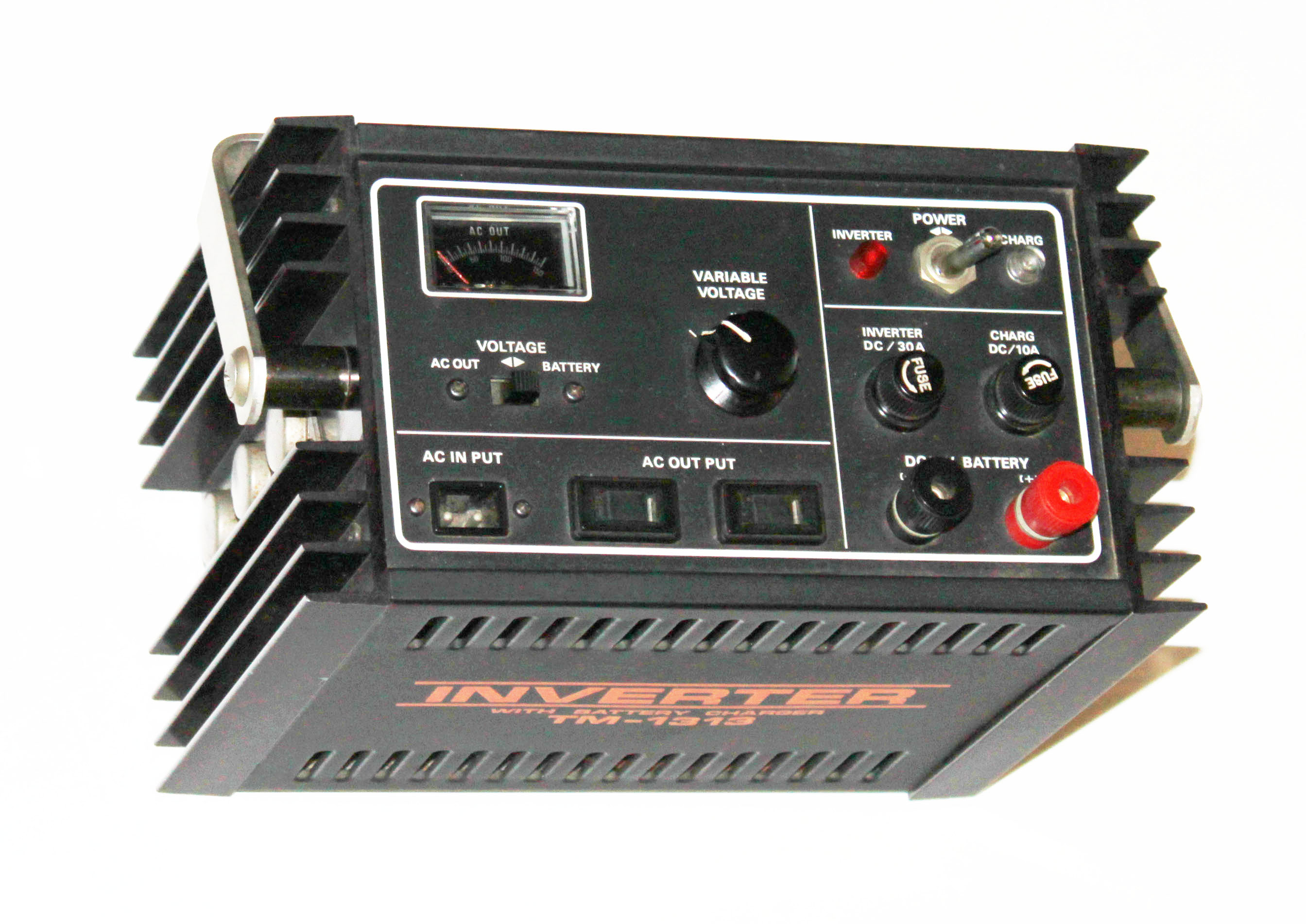
55Hz DC–AC inverter

The Royer oscillator circuit consists of a saturable-core transformer with a center-tapped primary winding, a feedback winding and (optionally) a secondary winding. The two halves of the primary are driven by two transistors in push-pull configuration. The feedback winding couples a small amount of the transformer power back to the transistor bases to provide positive feedback, thereby generating oscillation. The oscillation frequency is determined by the maximum magnetic flux density, the power supply voltage, and the inductance of the primary winding.

The basic Royer generates square wave output voltage, which can be an advantage for some applications. This square-wave output voltage can be converted to constant voltage (DC) by passing it through a suitable rectifier stage (typically a diode full-wave bridge followed by a filter choke and smoothing capacitor).

This circuit relies solely on magnetic core saturation to cause switching between the two states, which has three (3) important consequences:-

Firstly, the power loss in the core due to hysteresis loss is high, which decreases the power conversion efficiency. Power loss in magnetic materials is proportional to the peak flux-density raised to a power of between 2 and 3, and frequency raised to a power of between 1 and 2, refer to Steinmetz's equation.

Secondly, there is an upper limit to the frequency of operation. This causes practical Royer converters to be larger and heavier than more modern examples of switch-mode power supplies of similar power ratings that operate at much higher frequencies.

Thirdly, this limits the choice of suitable core material, here is a list of some common materials (note the power loss density):

Core material	Saturation Flux Density / G	Core Losses W/cm^{3} at 50 kHz
Toshiba MB	6000	0.49
Metglas2714A	6000	0.62
Square Permalloy 80 (0.5 mil)	7800	0.98
Square Permalloy 80 (1 mil)	7800	4.2
Ferrite Type 84	4000	4

== Applications ==
The classic Royer oscillator circuit is used in some DC–AC inverters where square-wave output is acceptable for the load. The DC-DC converter form (Royer Converter) was quite popular in the 1970s, during which time it was typically implemented with bipolar transistors. However, due to the disadvantages mentioned above the power levels are usually limited to below a few hundred watts.

== Variants & Improvements ==
=== Jensen Oscillator/Converter ===
By using a separate saturating magnetic core to provide only the control signals to the switching transistors, the main transformer is no longer required to saturate and so its power losses may be significantly reduced. Since the added transformer is much smaller than the main transformer, its power loss due to operation into saturation results in far lower power losses than would occur if the main transformer was operated into saturation. This results in a significant improvement in overall converter efficiency and permits the implementation of DC-AC inverters & DC-DC converters of much higher power ratings. Furthermore, the designer is now free to select or design the main transformer from a much wider range of suitable components and materials. This improvement was first patented by Jensen in 1955, just 16 months after Royer filed his patent on 06-Apr-1954.

=== Current-Fed Royer/Jensen Converter ===
A drawback of the original Royer oscillator is that the stress on the switching transistors is high during the switching transition time (this is the time when the transistor switch is changing state from either (a) OFF to ON, or (b) ON to Off). During this time, the transistors experience both high voltage and high current simultaneously, causing high instantaneous power dissipation within the transistor. This drawback is alleviated by inserting an inductor between the input power supply and the transformer center tap. This inductor allows the center-tap voltage to drop down during the aforementioned switching transition times while keeping the input current relatively constant (hence the name "current-fed"), thus allowing the voltage across each transistor to be low while the current is transferred from one transistor to the other, thereby greatly reducing the transistor instantaneous power dissipation. This improved version is called the current-fed Royer oscillator in some books.

In most examples of this improvement, this designer deliberately selects the inductance value of this inductor (units of henry) to be sufficiently large such that the current flowing in this inductor is relatively constant; typically the current will have a small ripple component, say, a peak-to-peak ripple of less than 30% of the average value. In such cases, this inductor is called a "DC choke" or just "choke", refer Choke (electronics).

This improvement may also be applied to the Jensen converter mentioned above.

=== Regulated Current-Fed Royer/Jensen Converter ===
A further refinement is the addition of a step-down converter between the input voltage source and the choke (inductor). This step-down converter may be used to regulate the current flowing in the choke, allowing the output voltage to be controlled. This refinement may, of course, be applied with equal effectiveness to both the original Royer and the Jensen variant. An early example of this can be found in the US patent by Jones.

== Later Developments ==
Technology is always advancing, and the development of self-oscillating circuits is no different in this regard. In 1959, just a few years after the Royer oscillator was patented and published, a new oscillator was invented that is commonly referred to as the "Baxandall inverter/converter" since it was patented by Peter James Baxandall, and was initially published by him in a 1959 conference paper which clearly describes its operation. Although the Baxandall inverter/converter really deserves its own Wikipedia article, it is mentioned here briefly because it is sometimes referred to as a "resonant Royer"; however, as the following will show, this is a misnomer since its principle of operation is completely different to that of the original Royer.

=== Sinewave Oscillator (Baxandall, aka "Resonant Royer" vs Original Royer) ===
There is another self-oscillating inverter/converter design known as the "Baxandall converter" (sometimes incorrectly called a "resonant Royer") which generates a sinewave output voltage rather than a square-wave voltage, which is also used for DC-DC conversion when connected to a suitable rectifier stage. This was first described in 1959 by Peter James Baxandall. There are three major differences between the Royer Oscillator and the Baxandall Oscillator, these differences are explained below, in the context of their application to the field of power conversion (DC-AC Power inverter, or DC-DC DC-to-DC converter).

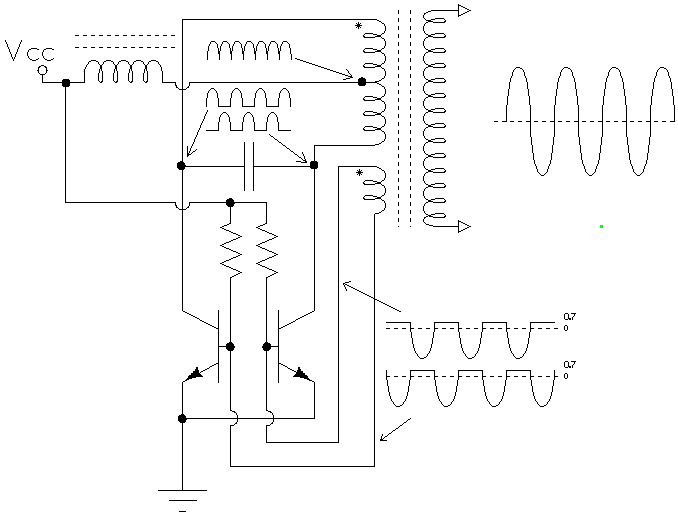
Baxandall converter (note the addition of the capacitor and inductor)

Firstly, a choke (inductor) is connected in series with the supply voltage to the transformer primary tap. This makes the Baxandall inverter current-fed, as per the current-fed variants of the Royer mentioned above.

Secondly, a resonant tank circuit is formed by adding a capacitor in parallel with the transformer, either on the primary side across the switching transistors, or on the secondary side across the output winding, or a combination of both. This change means that the Baxandall output voltage is a sine-wave (refer Sine wave), whereas the classic Royer circuit output voltage is a square wave (refer square wave).

Finally, the third major difference is that the transformer does not, or should not, saturate. Switching between the two transistors is brought about simply through the natural resonance that occurs between an inductor and a capacitor, and NOT by the saturation of a magnetic component. This is the fundamental difference between these two oscillators: The Royer self-oscillates due to the saturation of a magnetic component (refer Saturation (magnetic)), whereas the Baxandall self-oscillates due to L-C resonance (refer resonance).

==== Operation ====
When one transistor is on, its collector voltage is near zero and it directs the current of the input choke into one of the primary windings. At the same time, the other transistor is OFF, its current is zero while its voltage is a half-sine (peak = Vin * PI). The transistors direct the input current into each of the primary windings of the transformer alternately in turn. The opposing currents in the primary windings always balance but the whole primary "sees" the complete sinewave. In this manner, a sinewave is able to be generated while allowing the transistors to switch alternately fully on and off in push-pull mode. This is the only resemblance to the Royer converter.

The voltage on the transformer centre-tap node swings up and down as the inductor opposes current change. As a result the waveform appears much like the output of a full-wave rectifier (refer Rectifier). The d.c. supply voltage equates to the average, so the tap peaks at approximately (pi/2)*Vcc. As the transformer acts like a 2:1 autotransformer on the primary, the "off" transistor collector voltage reaches double, or pi times Vcc.

==== Applications ====
A circuit employing a similar idea appears in a 1973 patent for a DC-DC converter assigned to Bell Telephone Laboratories which, interestingly, uses both resonance and magnetic saturation.

A circuit of this type was used in driving the CRT of the Tektronix 547 oscilloscope.

Another application of the Baxandall converter is in powering Cold Cathode Fluorescent Lamps (CCFLs). CCFLs exhibit degradation in their current-to-light output efficiency in the presence of harmonics, so it is better to drive them with a sinewave than a square wave. In order to provide light intensity adjustment, an integrated circuit typically drives a pulse-width modulated signal in the gate of an additional transistor, forming a step-down ("buck") converter with the feeding choke. Other integrated circuits control also the two oscillator transistors and sense the zero valley of the transformer mid tap to do this.

The Baxandall converter has been used recently in driving fluorescent tubes from low-voltage sources, often using rechargeable batteries, for emergency lighting and camping etc. Also in his 1959 paper, Baxandall described a voltage-switched variant of the sinewave oscillator. This variant seems to have been the forerunner of most two-transistor drivers for compact fluorescent lamps (CFL's) which has been extended recently to drive low-voltage LED lamps.

==== Naming Confusion: "Baxandall" vs "Resonant Royer" ====
The original Royer oscillator/inverter is an example of a "self-oscillating circuit" since its frequency of operation is determined solely by the external source of power (the input DC voltage) and at least one of the main power components that process the full power that passes through the apparatus, refer note 1 below. There are other examples of self-oscillating inverters (and converters) that are sometimes referred to by the same name "Royer" (or variations thereof), despite the fact that they operate by completely different principles. The Baxandall Oscillator is a notable example, as it is sometimes referred to as a "resonant Royer", or "self-resonant Royer", or "L-C Royer", but its operation has nothing to do with magnetic saturation on which the Royer relies, it operates on the principle of the natural resonance of electrical energy that occurs between inductors and capacitors operating in their non-saturating states. Magnetic saturation is usually highly undesirable in a Baxandall oscillator, and in fact, is something designers of most power conversion equipment take great care to avoid. The fact that the original Royer uses magnetic saturation of its main power transformer core as its main principle of operation makes it quite unique in among the wide array of circuits that have been employed in the field of power conversion over the last few decades; so its name should not be carelessly applied to other power conversion circuits that do not rely on the same principle.

Unfortunately, this naming confusion has become prevalent in the modern literature (for example, in datasheets, and is one of the topics of this exchange between two highly respected practitioners of the art of circuit design.

The Royer oscillator was one of the early examples of self-oscillating circuits to become widely used and popularised, so it is perhaps understandable that the name "Royer" was applied to other self-oscillating circuits over the following decades. Furthermore, the word "Royer" or "Royer-class" is more convenient than writing "self-oscillating inverter/converter circuit based on magnetic saturation of the main power transformer". However, we should avoid incorrectly using the name "Royer" since it can only create confusion. It is now well over 50 years since these circuits were first invented, so the name "Royer" should be applied only to those circuits that adhere strictly to the concepts of the original patent.

The first name that appears on the original Patent for the Royer oscillator is Richard L. Bright and Royer's name appears second, yet the Royer oscillator is rarely referred to as the "Bright oscillator". By comparison, the name "Baxandall" appears as the first name - in fact, the only name - on both the Patent and the initial publication.

Note 1: Compare this to power-converter circuits that are not "self-oscillating", where the frequency of operation is independent of the main power components and is typically determined by an auxiliary control circuit that is not involved in any power transfer between the main power ports of the apparatus, eg: a control chip.
