= Melvin Jack Murdock =

American businessman and radio technician

Melvin "Jack" Murdock (August 15, 1917 – May 16, 1971) was an American businessman, philanthropist, and radio technician from Portland, Oregon. He was a co-founder of Tektronix, Inc.

== Background ==
Murdock was born in Portland, Oregon, on August 15, 1917. Upon graduating from Franklin High School, Murdock’s father offered him a choice of financing for college, or for a business. Murdock opened "Murdock Radio and Appliance Company" in 1935 in southeast Portland, where, in 1936, Howard Vollum began working as a radio technician in the back of the shop.

Murdock served in the United States Coast Guard during World War II.

== Tektronix, Inc. ==
In 1946 — headquartered a mere six blocks from his earliest family home — Murdock formed Tektronix, Inc. as an equal partnership with Vollum, fellow former "coastie" Miles Tippery, and accountant Glenn McDowell. Tektronix, Inc. quickly became one of the world’s largest manufacturers of oscilloscopes, as well as other electronic devices.

The founders were known humanitarians who undertook business operations as one might run a large and caring family. In 1978, Tektronix was named by authors Robert Levering and Milton Moskowitz, et al, as among The 100 best companies to work for in America in their book of the same name.

Murdock began as the company’s vice president and general manager, before assuming the role of chairman, in 1960 — a position he would hold until his passing, in 1971.

== Aviator and death ==
Jack Murdock began to learn flying in 1954 through a club hosted by Tektronix.

Outside of his work, Murdock was an aviator flying out of Pearson Airfield in Vancouver, Washington. He founded Melridge Aviation, the Piper Aircraft distributorship in the 11 western states and Alaska.

Murdock died on May 16, 1971, in a floatplane accident on the Columbia River. According to reports, there were high winds and the Super Cub overturned while taxiing on the water, near Maryhill, Washington. The airplane was top heavy because Murdock had installed extra auxiliary fuel tanks in the wings. His body was never recovered, and he was declared legally deceased on June 11, 1971. He was 53 years old.

== Accolades ==
In 1966, the University of Portland awarded Murdock an honorary Doctorate of Humane Letters.

Jack Murdock received the Silver Knight of Management award from the National Management Association for "outstanding record in management and labor relations."

Murdock initiated several modifications to make aircraft safer and more practical for pilots, and was posthumously inducted into The Oregon Aviation Hall of Honor in 2003.

The Jack Murdock Aviation center in Vancouver, Washington was named for Murdock, and is now the Pearson Air Museum

== Philanthropy ==
Murdock never married and had no immediate relatives. After his death in 1971 the majority of his estate — approximately $80 million – was left to the M.J. Murdock Charitable Trust.
