= Xerox Phaser =

Line of printers by Xerox

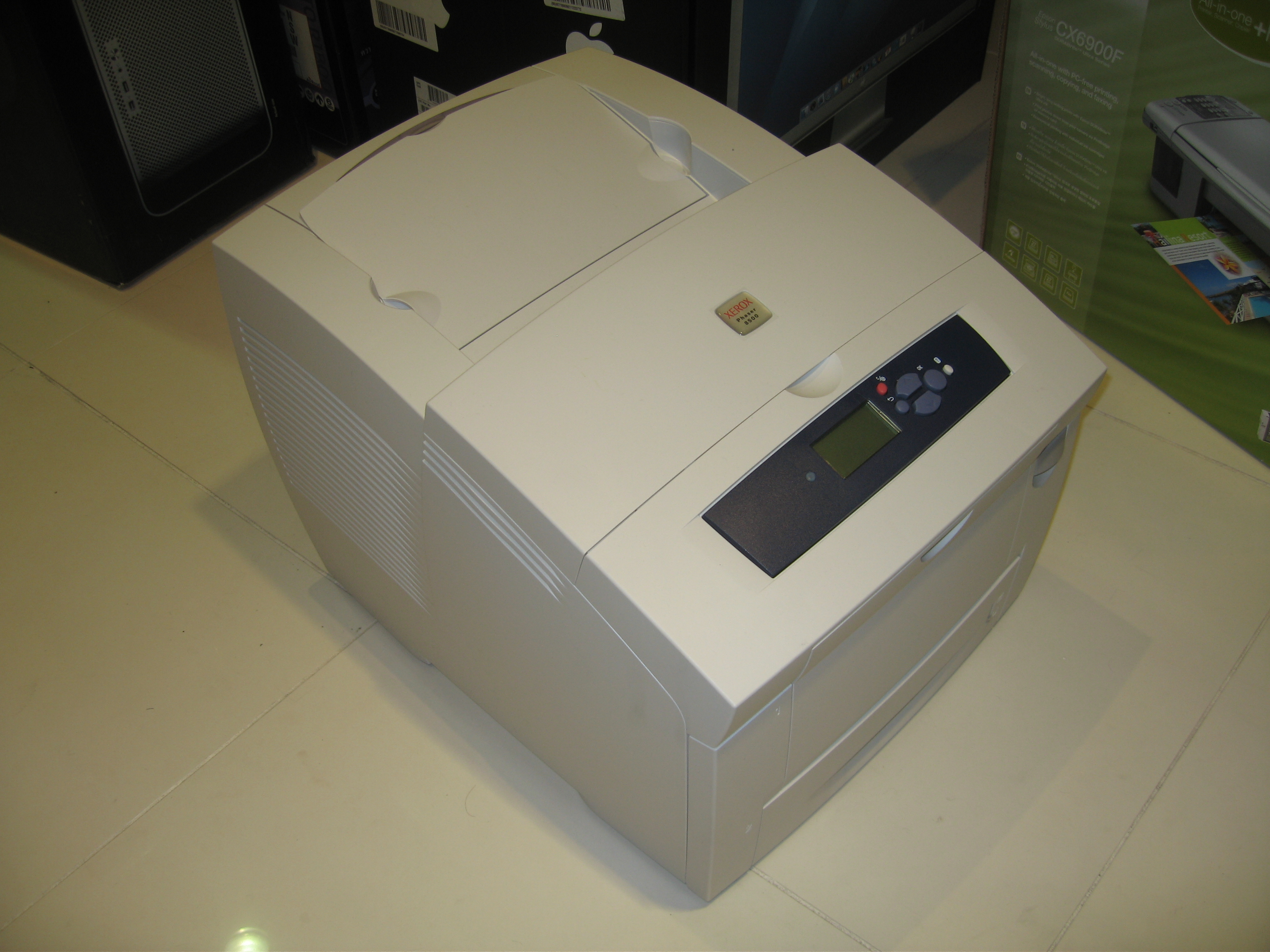
The Xerox Phaser 8500 uses Solid Ink technology

Xerox Phaser is the brand name for a line of color and monochrome printers produced and sold by Xerox. Some Phaser printers use Xerox Solid Ink. Phaser printers were originally manufactured and marketed by Tektronix, of Wilsonville, Oregon.

== The Acquisition of the Tektronix Color Printing and Imaging Division by Xerox ==
Xerox acquired the Tektronix Color Printing and Imaging Division, including the Phaser brand, in 2000. The Phaser brand has become a key component of Xerox's office product portfolio, and the company continues to expand the product line.

One important aspect of the acquisition of the Tektronix divisions is that Xerox kept Tektronix staff and support services, as Tektronix was known for high-performance and high-quality printers.

== The Phaser 7700 Series ==
The Xerox Phaser 7700 Series of color laser printers use the VxWorks Operating System on its 20GB PATA IDE Hard Drive.

The 7700 Series is a wide format duplex-capable laser printer capable of printing up to 12x18 page sizes. The average 8.5x11 Letter size speed is 23 pages per minute. ()

== Xerox Phaser 6100 ==
The Xerox Phaser 6100 is a low-price office color printer. The New York Times reported in 2004 that "revenue from color machines .. represents about 25 percent" of the company's revenue.

== Other models ==
The Xerox Phaser 2135 was a 21 page-per-minute color printer that printed at 1200 dots-per-inch. Other models were the 7500N, the 6700 and the 3600.
