= Howard Vollum =

American engineer, scientist, and businessman (1913–1986)

- Born: May 31, 1913; Portland, Oregon, U.S.
- Died: February 5, 1986 (aged 72)
- Occupations: Electronics engineer; businessman; philanthropist
- Known for: Co-founder of Tektronix Corporation

Charles Howard Vollum (May 31, 1913 – February 5, 1986) was an American electronics engineer, businessman, and philanthropist in Oregon, United States. He was the co-founder of Tektronix Corporation, and endowed the Vollum Institute.

== Background ==
Howard Vollum was born on May 31, 1913, in Portland, Oregon. He attended Portland's Catholic Columbia University (now University of Portland) from 1931 to 1933, then transferred to Reed College in 1934, where, in 1936, he received a Bachelor of Arts in Physics. His undergraduate thesis was the creation of a new kind of cathode-ray oscilloscope.

Upon graduation from college, he spent several years servicing and installing radios and experimenting with electronic devices. From 1940 to 1941 he was Supervisor of the Radio Project, National Youth Administration, in Portland. Vollum served as an officer in the United States Army Signal Corps from 1942 to 1946, serving in England and New Jersey on artillery fire control radar. He was later awarded the Legion of Merit for this work.

He was awarded the Howard N. Potts Medal in 1973.

Vollum died on February 5, 1986. His wife, Jean Vollum, continued to serve on the Tektronix board of directors until mandatory retirement at age 70, and continued philanthropy until her death in 2007. Vollum was survived by his five sons.

== Tektronix ==
In 1946, Vollum co-founded Tektronix with Jack Murdock, becoming equal partners, along with Murdock's fellow former "coastie" Miles Tippery, and accountant Glenn McDowell. The company mission was stated in the articles of incorporation as "to install, repair, service and sell, purchase, manufacture and otherwise acquire and deal in radio and other instruments."

By 1951, the company had 300 employees and sales of $4 million; by 1959, there were 3,000 employees with sales at $32 million. Tektronix had become the leading oscilloscope manufacturer, a position that held up until the 1970s. Vollum served as president of the company from 1946 until 1971. In 1978, Tektronix was lauded by authors Robert Levering and Milton Moskowitz, et al, in their book, The 100 best companies to work for in America. He remained on its board of directors until his death, and was board chairman until 1984 and then vice chairman.

== The Vollum Institute ==
Vollum's innate interest in science also drew him to the neuroscience laboratories at the Oregon Health and Science University (OHSU) where he knew his oscilloscope could be applied to healthcare research. He developed an interest in experiments measuring bio-electrical phenomena, and this ultimately provided his philanthropic motivation and led Vollum to endow an institute for advanced biomedical research at OHSU.

== Other activities ==
Vollum supported many Oregon educational institutions, including Reed College in Portland, which has a prominent academic building and student activity program named for him. Vollum helped found the Oregon Graduate Center (renamed Oregon Graduate Institute; now part of OHSU) in 1965 with a $2 million grant and, upon his death in 1986, bequeathed $14.8 million to the college as an endowment. His will also included a $3.8 million bequest to the Catlin Gabel School.

Howard and Jean Vollum also funded the construction of the Library Building at Mount Angel Abbey in Mt. Angel, Oregon; the award-winning building was one of very few structures in the United States designed by the Finnish architect Alvar Aalto, and stands as a remarkable architectural accomplishment.
