= Continuous ink system =

Inkjet printing method

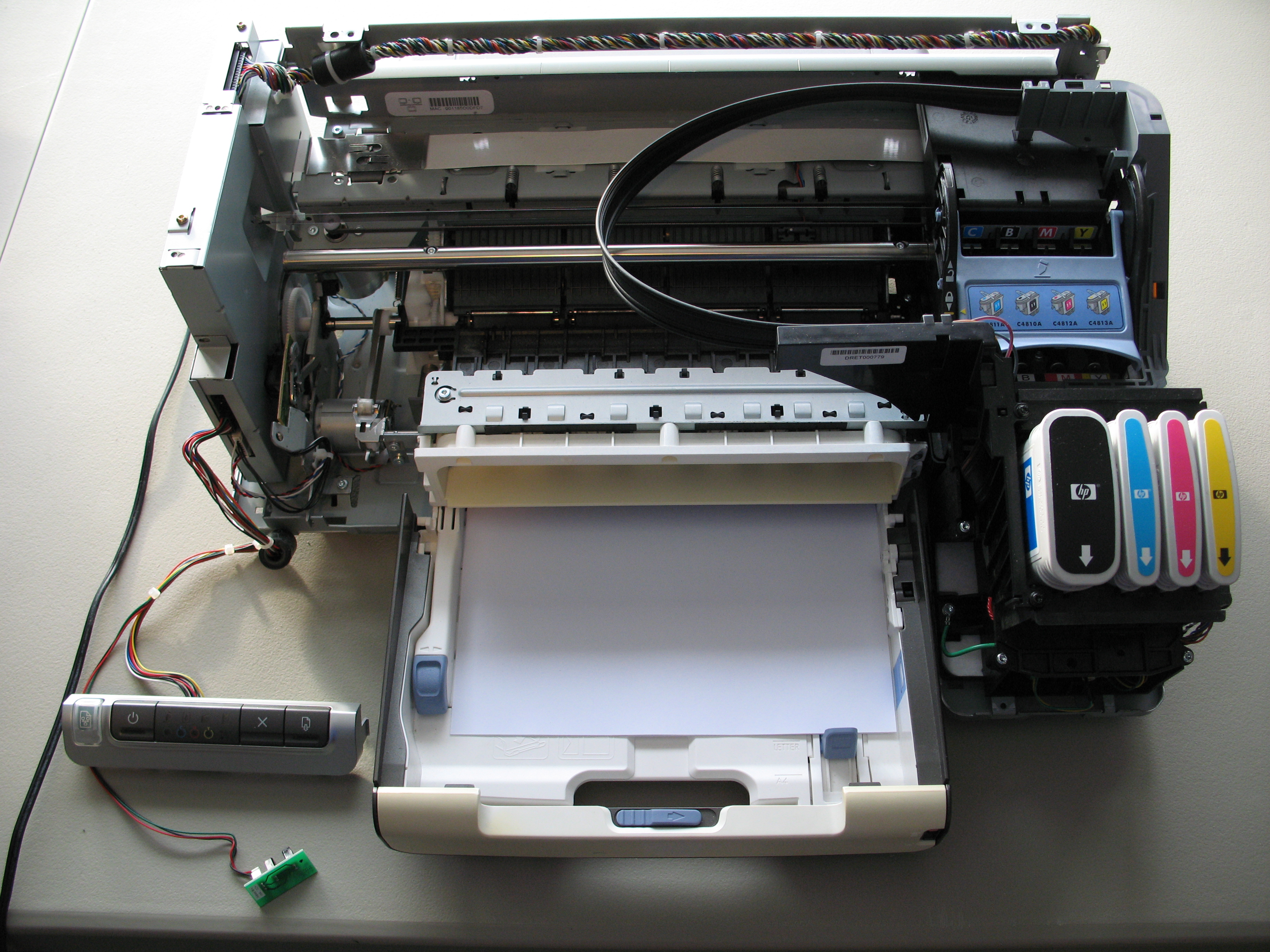
Continuous ink system in an HP Business Inkjet 1200n. The ink is transported from tanks through the black flexible band, which is vertically rigid so it does not fall into the path of the printhead and cause a jam.

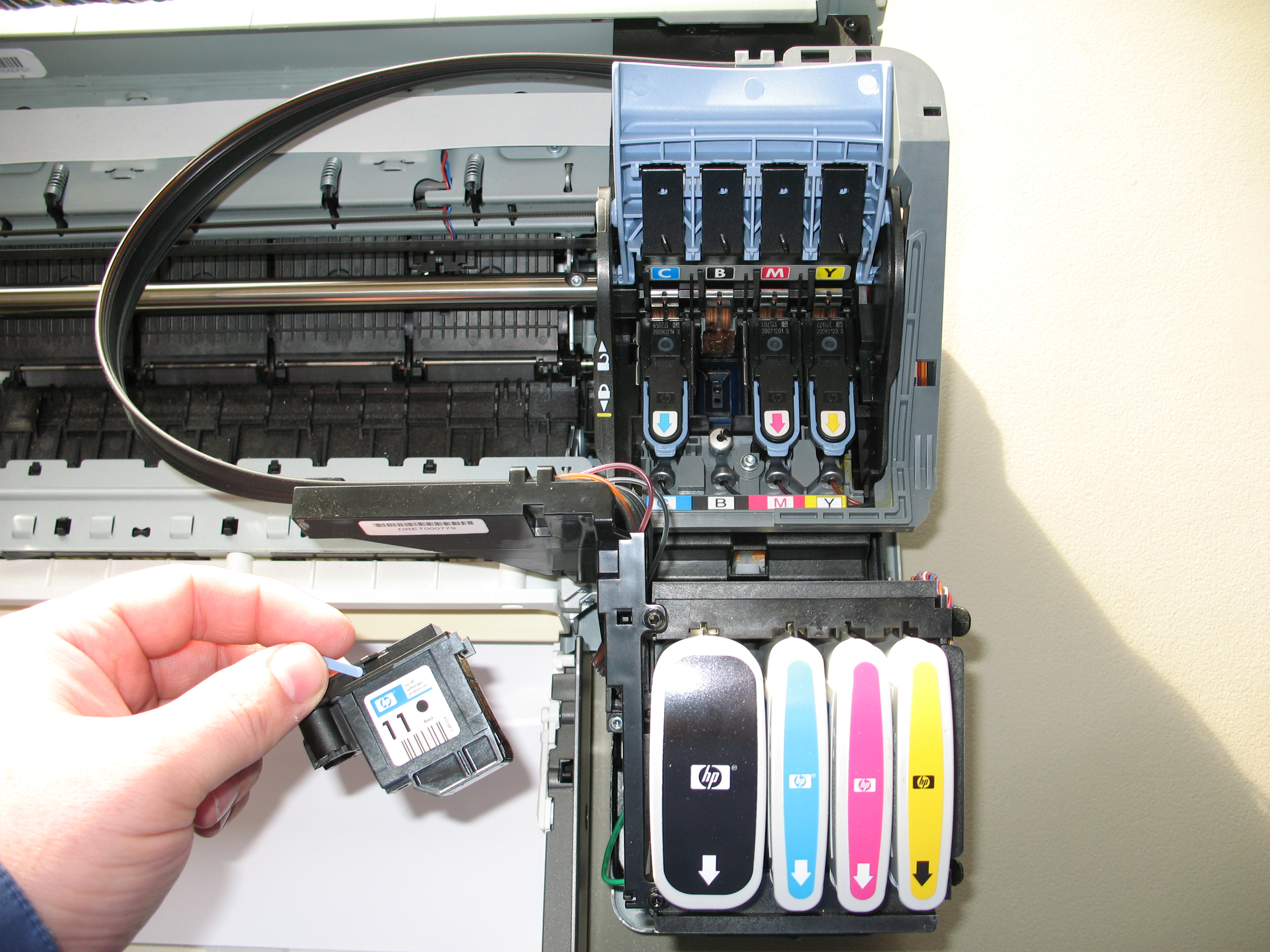
Close-up view of the above printer, showing the individual removable printheads and ink tanks for each color.

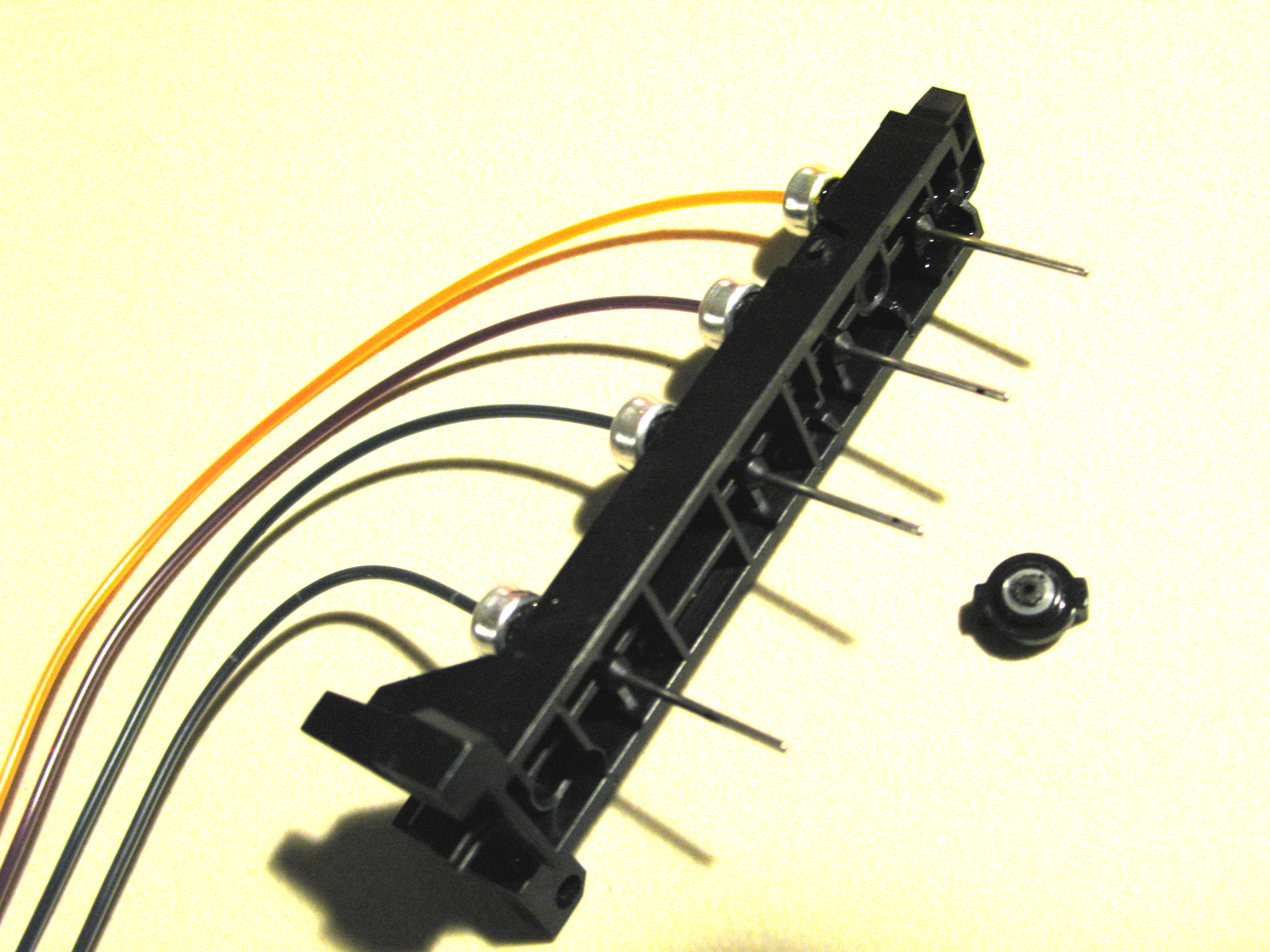
Disassembled view of the above printer. Metal needles insert into the ink tanks to collect ink. The liquid inlet is a notch cut into the side of the needle, with a spring-loaded sliding rubber cap (shown) that slides up over the notch when the tank is removed. This design retains moisture inside the ink supply tubing and prevents dry-out and clogging when ink tanks are either not installed, or are removed for replacement.

A continuous ink system (CIS), also known as a continuous ink supply system (CISS), a continuous flow system (CFS), an automatic ink refill system (AIRS), a bulk feed ink system (BFIS), or an off-axis ink delivery system (OIDS) is a method for delivering a large volume of liquid ink to a comparatively small inkjet printhead. Many business and professional grade printers incorporate a continuous ink system in their design to increase printing capacity.

Some aftermarket companies also build retrofit accessories to convert certain models of consumer-grade printers into continuous flow systems. Such systems have been frowned upon by most printer manufacturers, as they have been seen as a threat to their business model of selling the printer itself as a loss leader and making their profit off replacement ink cartridges, prompting lawsuits against aftermarket firms or the implementation of digital rights management measures in their devices (see razor and blades model). Some manufacturers have introduced printer models featuring continuous ink systems. This was seen as a welcome move by users especially small business owners who rely on bulk-printing solutions like internet cafes and small-scale print shops.

== Comparison to the tank-on-printhead design ==
Most low-cost consumer printers place small ink tanks directly on the carriage with the printheads. These tanks can have extremely small liquid volumes, as low as 10 mL, and consequently require frequent replacement. It should be also noted that every cartridge replacement is usually automatically followed by head-cleaning cycle of the printer to remove air bubbles from system, further reducing usable ink amount. More expensive, business-grade printers use progressively larger ink tanks on the printhead, but as the platen width and speed of the printer increases it eventually becomes impractical to have the tanks integrated with the printheads due to the high mass and inertia the liquid volume adds to the printheads and the reduced accuracy of printing that occurs.

Separating the ink storage from the printhead may also allow the tank to be refilled or replaced while a print job is in progress. With ink tanks located on the printhead, replacement typically requires reprising and alignment checks that necessarily require aborting any current print job. Separated ink tanks can be refilled or reprimed without disrupting a very large or expensive printing task, such as printing a 2 meter wide by 10 meter long outdoor banner.

== Retrofit accessory kits ==
Many continuous ink systems have been developed to cover most Epson, HP, Canon, and other printers. These bulk feed systems also allow users to use inexpensive aftermarket inkjet inks as well as specialty inks for T-shirt transfers or inks for black-and-white printing. These options have allowed users to produce specialty prints at a fraction of the cost of purchasing special cartridges or using more expensive printing solutions.

Retrofit continuous ink tanks designs vary, and most incorporate a constant level, barometric pressure design. Constant-level continuous ink systems deliver a smooth flow of ink to the cartridges as needed. The front tank is vented to atmosphere, and negative gauge air pressure in the back tank delivers ink to the cartridges.

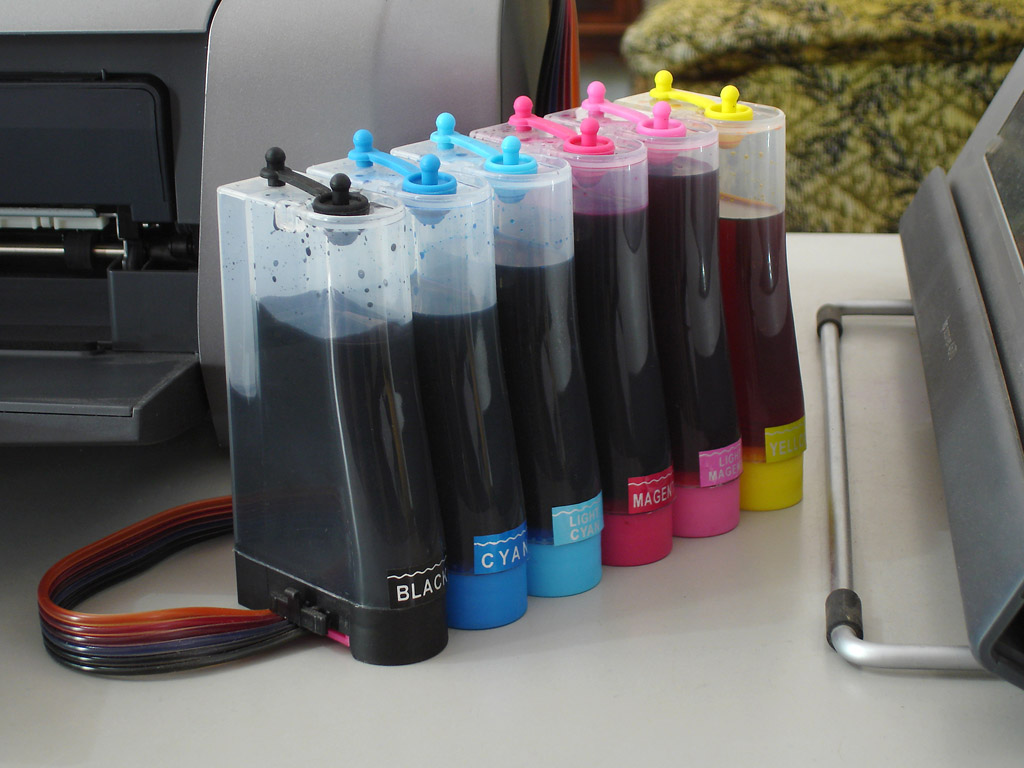
Retrofit ink tanks

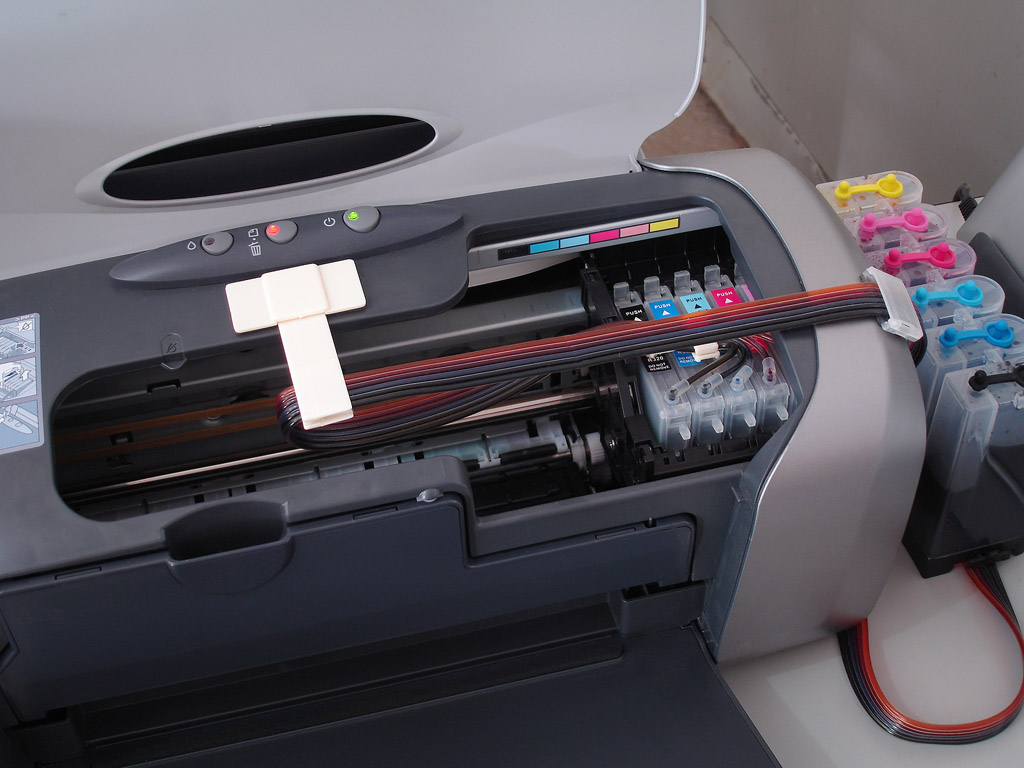
Retrofit ink tubes suspended from the T-shaped plastic support

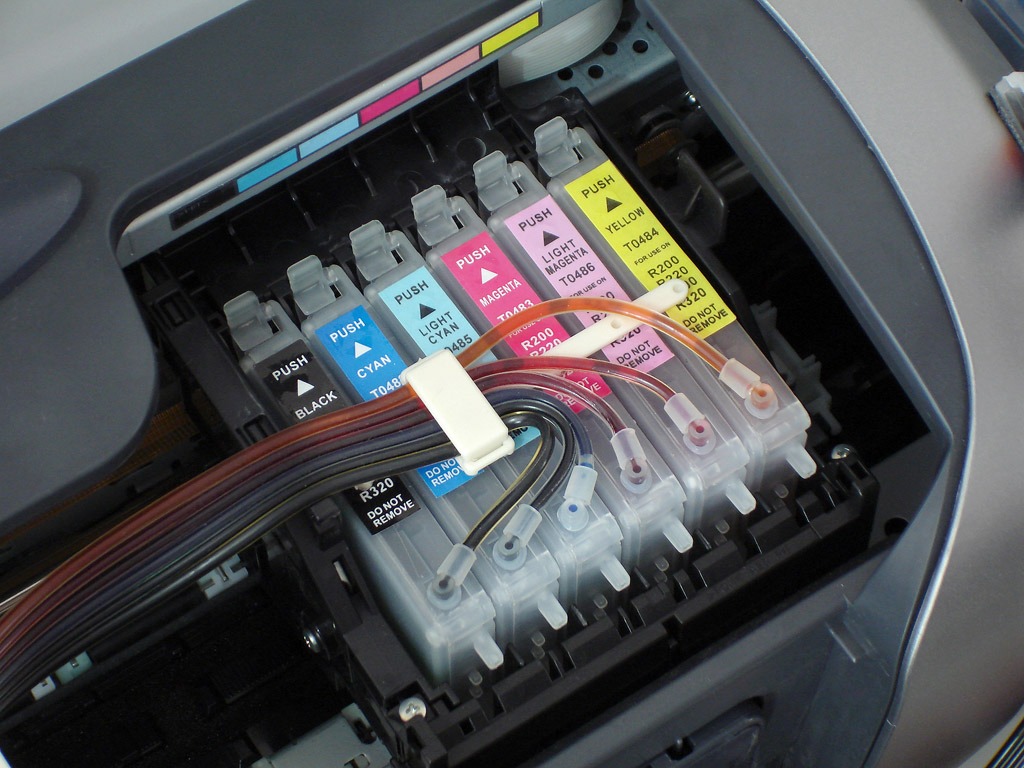
Retrofit ink tubes connected to a standard printer cartridge

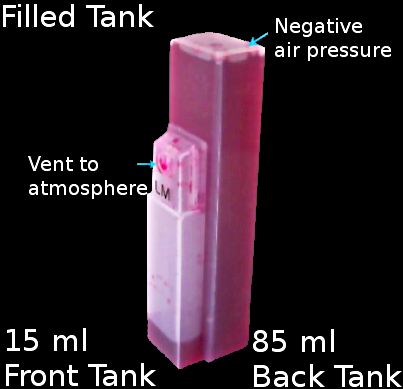
Retrofit ink tank design

=== Limitations of retrofitting ===
Many consumer grade printers are designed with close-fitting and sometimes fully enclosing shrouds over the print carriage. It may be difficult or impossible to install a retrofit kit because there is no room to install the flexible tubing that must flex and bend as the printhead moves back and forth. Jamming may occur if the tubing droops into the path of the printhead and is crushed underneath the printhead or between the printhead and cover. It may be necessary to modify the printer by removing the cover or cutting slots into the body to provide an open space for the tubing.

Some tank-on-carriage printers such as Epson use a fold-over clamping system over the tank to secure it in place on the print carriage. This clamp blocks the path of tubing from a continuous flow system feeding the tanks, and the print carriage may need to be modified by removing the clamp, cutting holes in the clamp, or installing a retrofit open-top clamp.

Typically, modifications to a product's functionality, such as installing an aftermarket continuous ink system, will void the manufacturer's warranty for defects. Some printer manufacturers explicitly state that use of third-party inks and/or aftermarket continuous ink systems will void their product warranty.

== Factory supertank systems ==
Supertank printers – a subset of CISS technology – have high-capacity integrated ink tanks or ink packs, and are manually refilled via ink bottles. When supertank ink systems are paired with disposable printhead technology, replaceable cartridges are used to replace the exhausted print heads.
