= Water jet =

Water jet may refer to:

- A jet of water under pressure, like in an ornamental fountain or drain cleaner
- Pump-jet, a marine propulsion mechanism for jetskis and other types of boats
- Water jet cutter, a tool for cutting and the machining of engineering materials
- Water-jet printer, a printer that makes use of water instead of ink
- Dental water jet, see Oral irrigator
- Jet spray, see Bidet shower
