= Bubble jet =

Bubble Jet may refer to:

- a type of printer for inkjet printing
- bubble jet effect of a naval mine
