= Printer (publishing) =

Printing terminology

Print shops in the 15th century per establishment date and book output

In publishing, printers are both companies providing printing services and individuals who directly operate printing presses.

Associations of printers have called their trade that of typothetae — as in the association "The United Typothetae of America".

== Origins of printing ==
The history of printers in publishing in Western Europe dates back to the mid-15th century with the invention of the printing press. Johannes Gutenberg, a German goldsmith, is credited with developing movable type in the 1450s. His printing press incorporated various innovative techniques, such as individual metal letter blocks and an oil-based ink, enabling faster and more efficient book production.

== Evolution of printing presses ==
=== Gutenberg press ===
Gutenberg's press set the foundation for subsequent developments in printing technology. It comprised a heavy wooden frame with a screw mechanism, enabling the even application of pressure to inked type and paper. Gutenberg's printing press accelerated the production of books, leading to the spread of knowledge and the democratization of information.

=== Mechanical and industrial advances ===
In the following centuries, printing presses underwent significant advancements. In the 18th century, the steam-powered press was introduced, enabling higher print volumes. Subsequently, the Industrial Revolution brought forth the development of cylinder presses, powered by steam or mechanized systems. These presses could print thousands of pages per hour, marking a substantial leap in production capabilities.

=== Offset lithography ===
In the late 19th century, the introduction of offset lithography revolutionized the printing industry. This technique used a flat metal plate with an image to transfer ink to a rubber blanket, which, in turn, printed the image onto the paper. Offset lithography offered more efficient and cost-effective printing, enabling high-quality reproductions and color printing on a large scale.

== Types ==
Printers can include:

- Newspaper printers, often owned by newspaper publishers
- Magazine printers, usually independent of magazine publishers
- Book printers, often not directly connected with book publishers
- Postcard printers
- Stationery printers
- Packaging printers
- Trade printers, who offer wholesale rates within the printing industry
- Wide-format printers, who specialize in wide format prints, such as signs and banners
- Printmakers, artists who create their artworks using printing
