= Jet (fluid) =

Stream of fluid projected into the surrounding medium

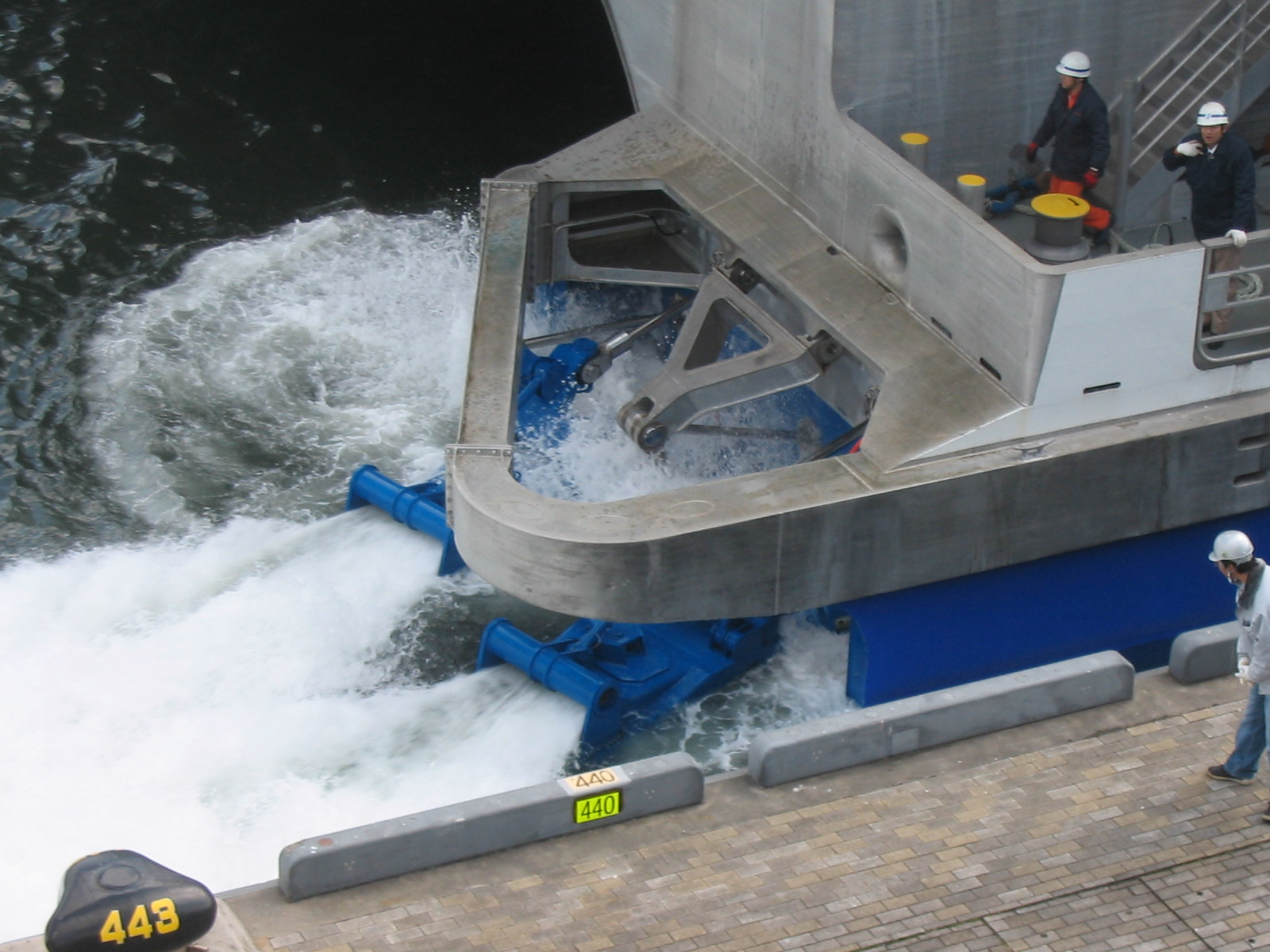
Jets from a pump-jet on a ferry.

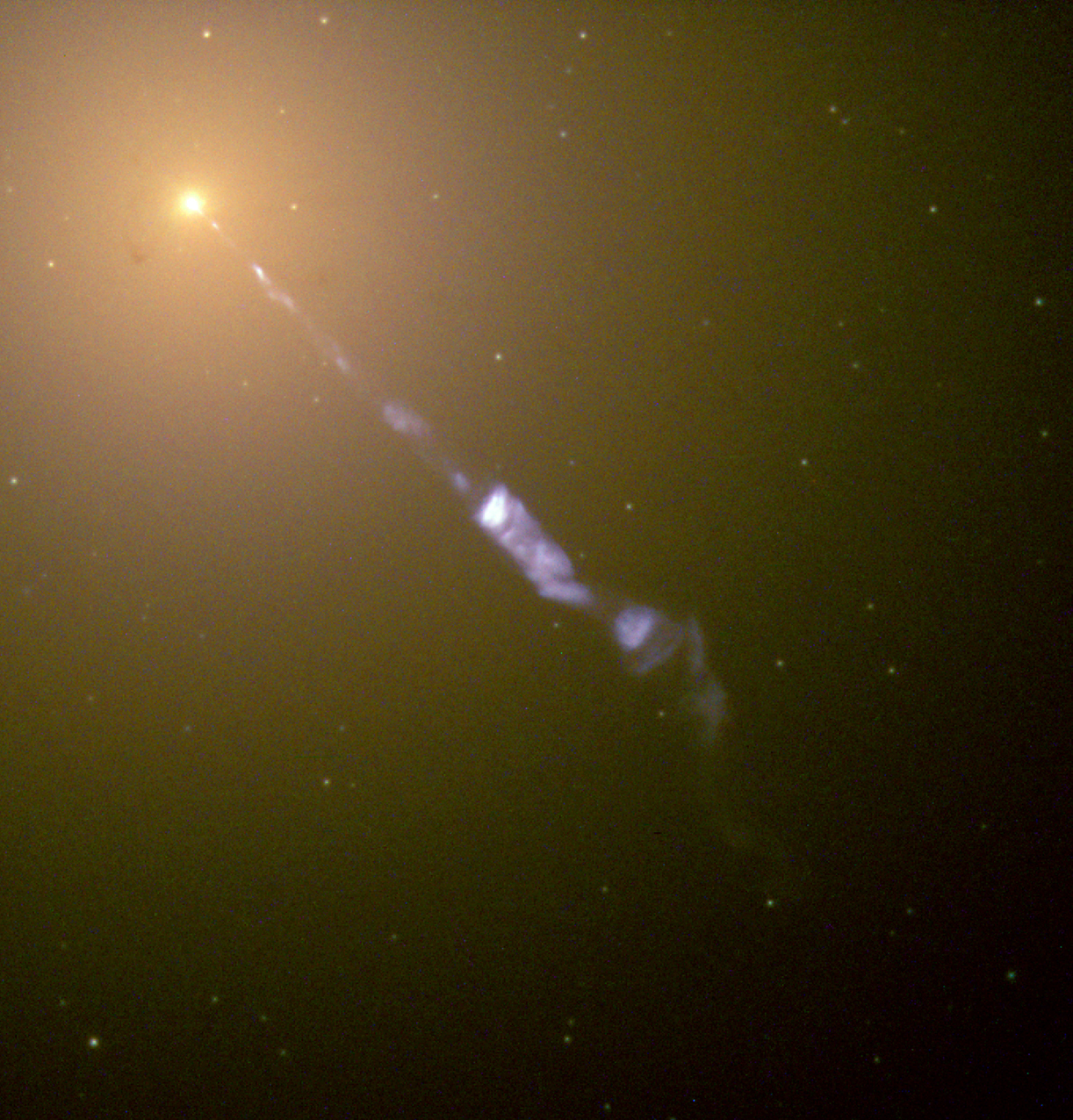
A relativistic jet emitted from galaxy M87, as seen by the Hubble Space Telescope.

A jet is a stream of fluid that is projected into a surrounding medium, usually from some kind of a nozzle, aperture or orifice. Jets can travel long distances without dissipating.

Jet fluid has higher speed compared to the surrounding fluid medium. In the case that the surrounding medium is assumed to be made up of the same fluid as the jet, and this fluid has viscosity, some of the surrounding fluid is carried along with the jet in a process called entrainment.

Some animals, notably cephalopods, move by jet propulsion, as do rocket engines and jet engines.

== Applications ==
Liquid jets are used in many different areas. In everyday life, typical applications include the water tap, the showerhead, and from spray cans. In agriculture, they play a role in irrigation and in the application of crop protection products. In medicine, liquid jets are used in injection procedures or inhalers. Industrial uses liquid jets for waterjet cutting, for coating materials or in cooling towers. Atomized liquid jets are essential for the efficiency of internal combustion engines. But they also play a crucial role in research, for example in the study of proteins, phase transitions, extreme states of matter, laser plasmas, High harmonic generation, and also in particle physics experiments. Also some animals, notably cephalopods, move by jet propulsion. Gas jets are found in rocket engines and jet engines. Microscopic liquid jets have been studied for their potential application in noninvasive transdermal drug delivery.

== See also ==
- Plane counterflow jets
- Bickley jet
- Landau–Squire jet
- Schlichting jet
- Jet nozzle, how a jet is formed
- Jet damping, a jet carries away angular momentum from a device emitting it
- Jet noise
- Jet of blood
- Astrophysical jet
- Solar jet
- Lava fountain
- High pressure jet
- Water jet
