= SUN Innovations =

Sun Innovations Company

SUN Innovations is a holding company, developer and manufacturer of wide-format printing equipment. Its main products are a UV-LED printer (NEO Evolution) and UV; solvent inks for wide format printing ("Sunflower" and "NANOiNK" respectively). SUN Innovations is a pioneer in the sphere of UV-LED printing technologies. It launched wide format printers based on the LED technology of ink curing, which allows printing on a wide range of materials including wood, metal, plastic, glass, mirrors, banner and fabric.

== History ==
SUN Innovations was established in 1998 as a privately held company. Today, SUN has partners and sells its solutions for digital printing in over 70 countries. In 2010, SUN Innovations was supported by the governmental organization Rusnano, which was established to foster the growth of nanotechnology industries in Russia. In 2010, Rusnano became an investor in SUN Innovations. On March 1, 1998, the company was founded in Novosibirsk. Initially, the company's main activity was the sale of consumables for the production of advertising and lighting equipment.

- 2003 – started selling Chinese solvent printers & inks.
- 2005 - established the largest at that time in the Russian service center for printing products and research. The company produced the first solvent ink in Russia and moved from the resale of the equipment to production.
- 2006 – opened its first ink factory in Russia under the brand SunFlower.
- 2007 - entered the international market with UV printer NEO Evolution.
- 2010 – accepted investment from RUSANO and becomes its portfolio company.
- 2010 – invented full-color printing on water surface.
- 2011 – created new UV ink formula according to “eco” and “nano” mission with antibacterial effect based on silver nanoparticles.
- 2012 – introduced Evolution printers with higher printing speed and new fast-drying solvent inks Turbo-S.
- 2013 – released a new version of UV printer – Sun Universal. Features included: web-based interface; ink measurement; easy to control zoning vacuum table; automatic parking, conservation and cleaning of the printhead; metering sensor height of the material; automatic material positioning

== Directors ==
Founder is Solovyova Svetlana Vladimirovna (share in the authorized capital: 100%).

Bankruptcy Trustee is Petrakov Pavel Vladimirovich.
