= Inkjet printing =

Type of computer printing

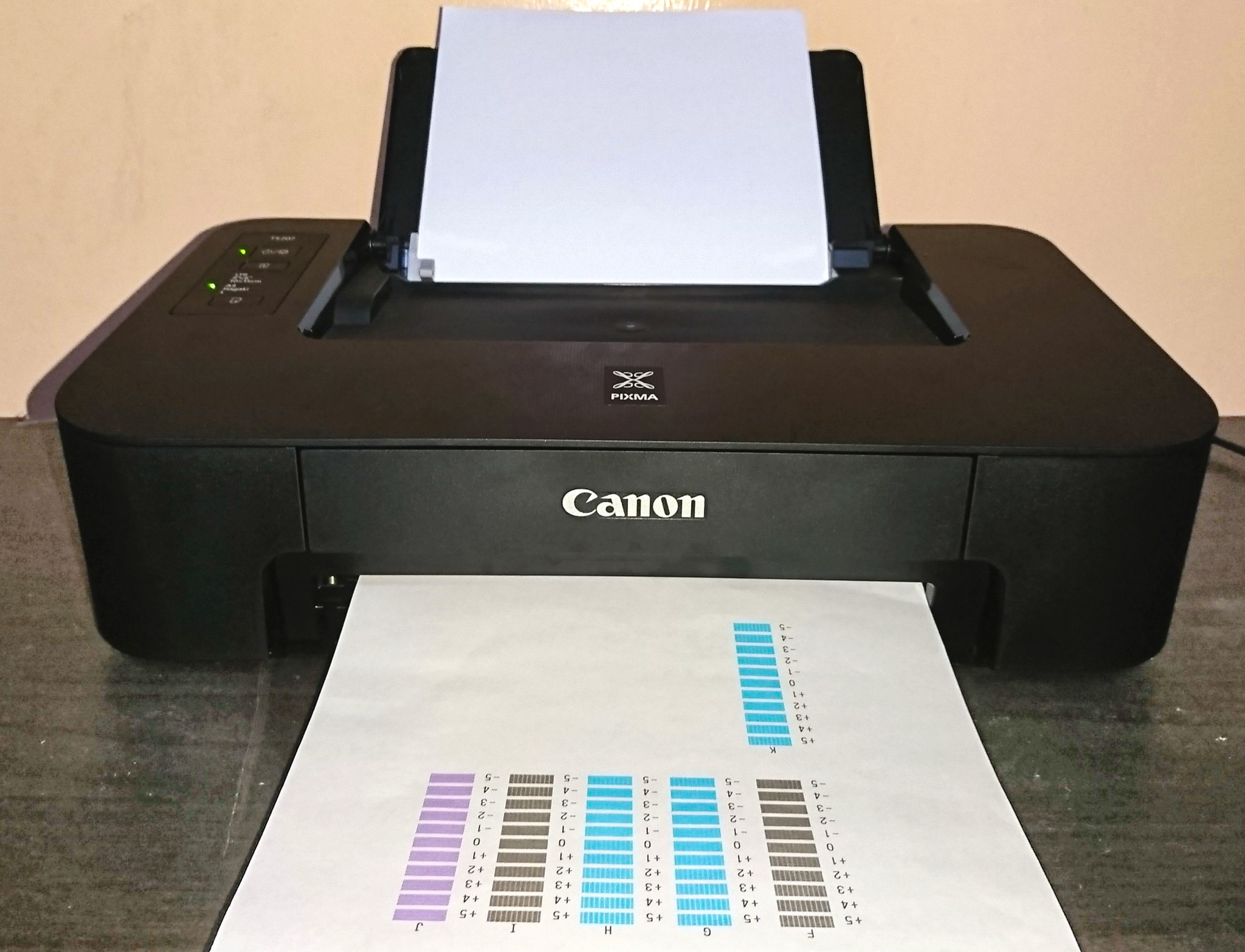
A typical inkjet printer

Inkjet printing is a type of computer printing that recreates a digital image by propelling very fine droplets of ink onto various substrates such as paper, plastic, wood and metal.

The concept of inkjet printing originated in the 20th century, and the technology was first extensively developed in the early 1950s. While working at Canon in Japan, Ichiro Endo suggested the idea for a "bubble jet" printer, while around the same time Jon Vaught at Hewlett-Packard (HP) was developing a similar idea. In the late 1970s, inkjet printers that could reproduce digital images generated by computers were developed, mainly by Epson, HP and Canon. In the worldwide consumer market, four manufacturers account for the majority of inkjet printer sales: Canon, HP, Epson and Brother.

In 1982, Robert Howard came up with the idea to produce a small color printing system that used piezos to spit drops of ink. He formed the company, R.H. (Robert Howard) Research (named Howtek, Inc. in Feb 1984), and developed the revolutionary technology that led to the Pixelmaster color printer with solid ink using Thermojet technology. This technology consists of a tubular single nozzle acoustical wave drop generator invented originally by Steven Zoltan in 1972 with a glass nozzle and improved by the Howtek inkjet engineer in 1984 with a Tefzel molded nozzle to remove unwanted fluid frequencies.

The emerging ink jet material deposition market also uses inkjet technologies, typically printheads using piezoelectric crystals, to deposit materials directly on substrates.

The technology has been extended and the "ink" can now also comprise solder paste in PCB assembly, or living cells, for creating biosensors and for tissue engineering.

Images produced on inkjet printers are sometimes sold under trade names such as Digigraph, Iris prints, giclée, and Cromalin. Inkjet-printed fine art reproductions are commonly sold under such trade names to imply a higher-quality product and avoid association with everyday printing.

== Methods ==
Fluid surface tension naturally pulls a stream into droplets. Optimal drop sizes of 0.004 inches (0.10 mm) require an inkjet nozzle size of about 0.003 inches (0.076 mm). Fluids with surface tension may be water based, wax or oil based and even melted metal alloys. Most drops can be electrically charged. There are two main technologies in use in contemporary inkjet printers: continuous (CIJ) and drop-on-demand (DOD). Continuous inkjet means the flow is pressurized and in a continuous stream. Drop-on-demand means the fluid is expelled from the jet nozzle one drop at a time. This can be done with a mechanical means with a push or some electrical method. A large electrical charge can pull drops out of a nozzle, sound waves can push fluid from a nozzle or a chamber volume expansion can expel a drop. Continuous streaming dates back to at least 1929. Although the first drop-on-demand piezo inkjet device was patented in 1950 by Clarence W. Hansell, this was never developed into a commercial product.

=== Continuous inkjet ===
Schematic diagram of a continuous inkjet printing process

The continuous inkjet (CIJ) method is used commercially for marking and coding of products and packages with best-by dates, lot and batch codes, and other product information. In 1867, Lord Kelvin patented the syphon recorder, which recorded telegraph signals as a continuous trace on paper using an ink jet nozzle deflected by a magnetic coil. The first commercial devices (medical strip chart recorders) were introduced in 1951 by Siemens using the patent US2566443 issued to Rune Elmqvist dated September 4, 1951.

In CIJ technology, a high-pressure pump directs liquid ink from a reservoir through a gunbody and a microscopic nozzle (usually .003 inch diameter), creating a continuous stream of ink droplets via the Plateau-Rayleigh instability. A piezoelectric crystal may be used to create an acoustic wave as it vibrates within the gunbody and causes the stream of liquid to break into droplets at regular intervals: 64,000 to 165,000 irregular-sized ink droplets per second may be achieved. The ink droplets are subjected to an electrostatic field created by a charging electrode or by a magnetic flux field as they form; the field varies according to the degree of drop deflection desired. This results in a controlled deflection by electrostatic charge on each droplet. Charged droplets may be separated by one or more uncharged "guard droplets" to minimize electrostatic repulsion between neighboring droplets.

The droplets pass through another electrostatic or magnetic field and are directed (deflected) by electrostatic deflection plates or flux field to print on the receptor material (substrate), or allowed to continue on deflected to a collection gutter for re-use. The more highly charged droplets are deflected to a greater degree. Only a small fraction of the droplets is used to print, the majority being recycled.

CIJ is one of the oldest (1951) ink jet technologies in use and is fairly mature. Drop-on-demand was not invented until later. The major advantages of CIJ are the very high velocity (≈20 m/s) of the ink droplets, which allows for a relatively long distance between print head and substrate, and the very high drop ejection frequency, allowing for very high speed printing. Another advantage is freedom from nozzle clogging as the jet is always in use, therefore allowing volatile solvents such as ketones and alcohols to be employed, giving the ink the ability to "bite" into the substrate and dry quickly. The ink system requires active solvent regulation to counter solvent evaporation during the time of flight (time between nozzle ejection and gutter recycling), and from the venting process whereby air that is drawn into the gutter along with the unused drops is vented from the reservoir. Viscosity is monitored and a solvent (or solvent blend) is added to counteract solvent loss.

In the later 1950s, heated wax inks became popular with CIJ technologies. In 1971, Johannes F. Gottwald patent US3596285A, Liquid Metal Recorder used molten metal ink with a magnetic flux field to fabricate formed symbols for signage. This may have been the first 3D metal object printed using magnetic core memory as data to produce each symbol.

=== Drop-on-demand ===
Piezoelectric (left) and thermal (right) drop generation schematic. A print head will contain several such nozzles, and will be moved across the page as paper advances through the printer.

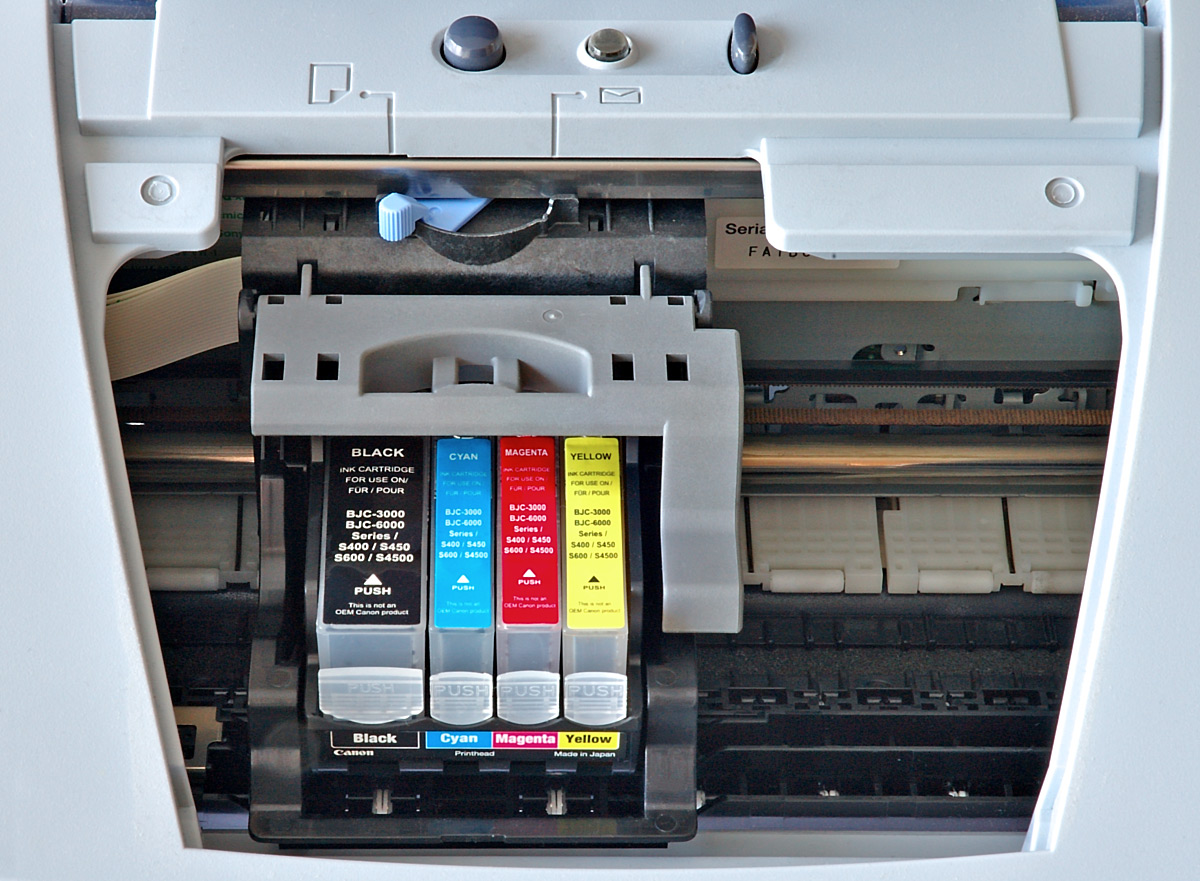
A Canon inkjet with CMYK cartridges

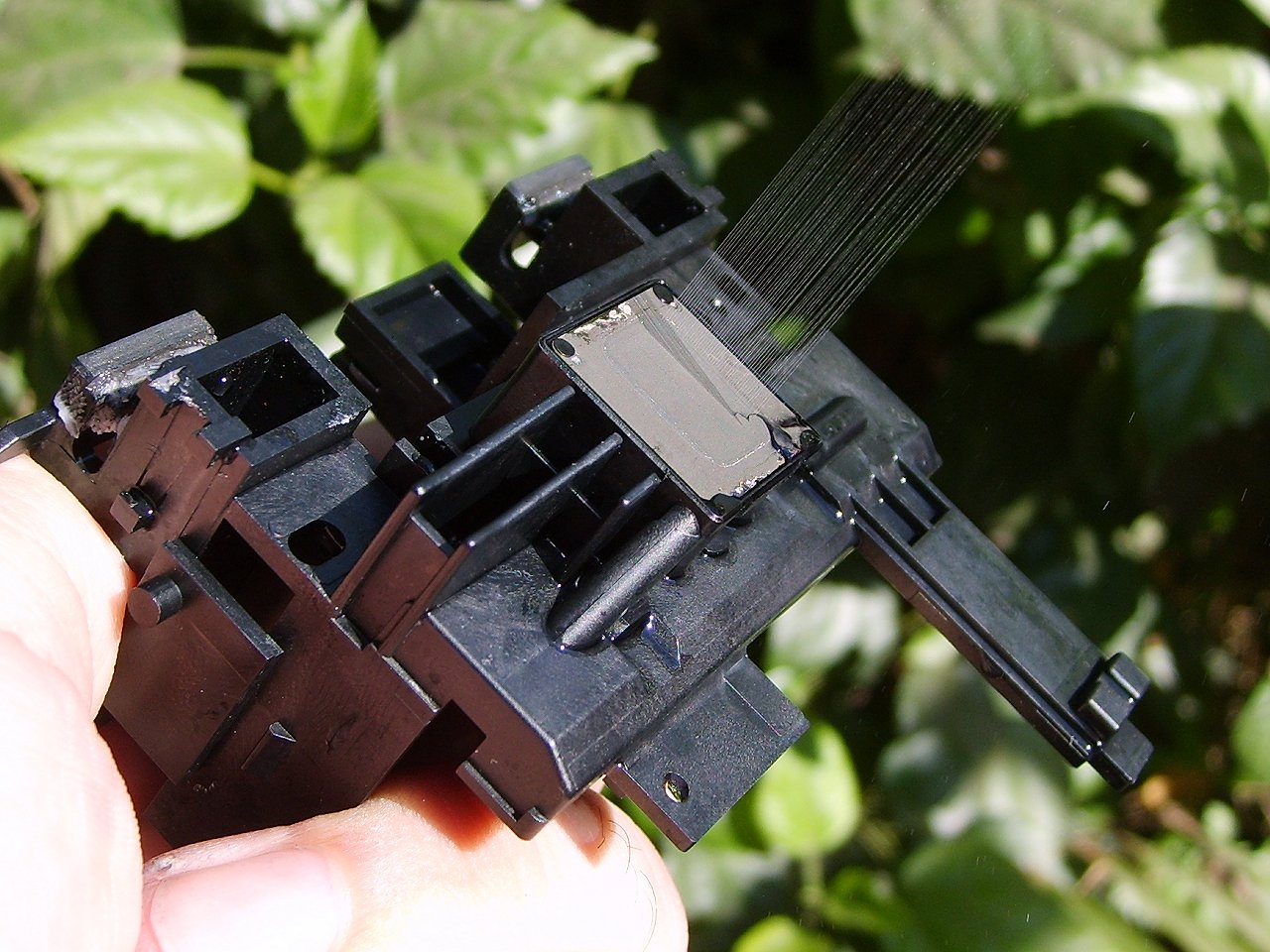
Piezoelectric printhead of an Epson C20 printer

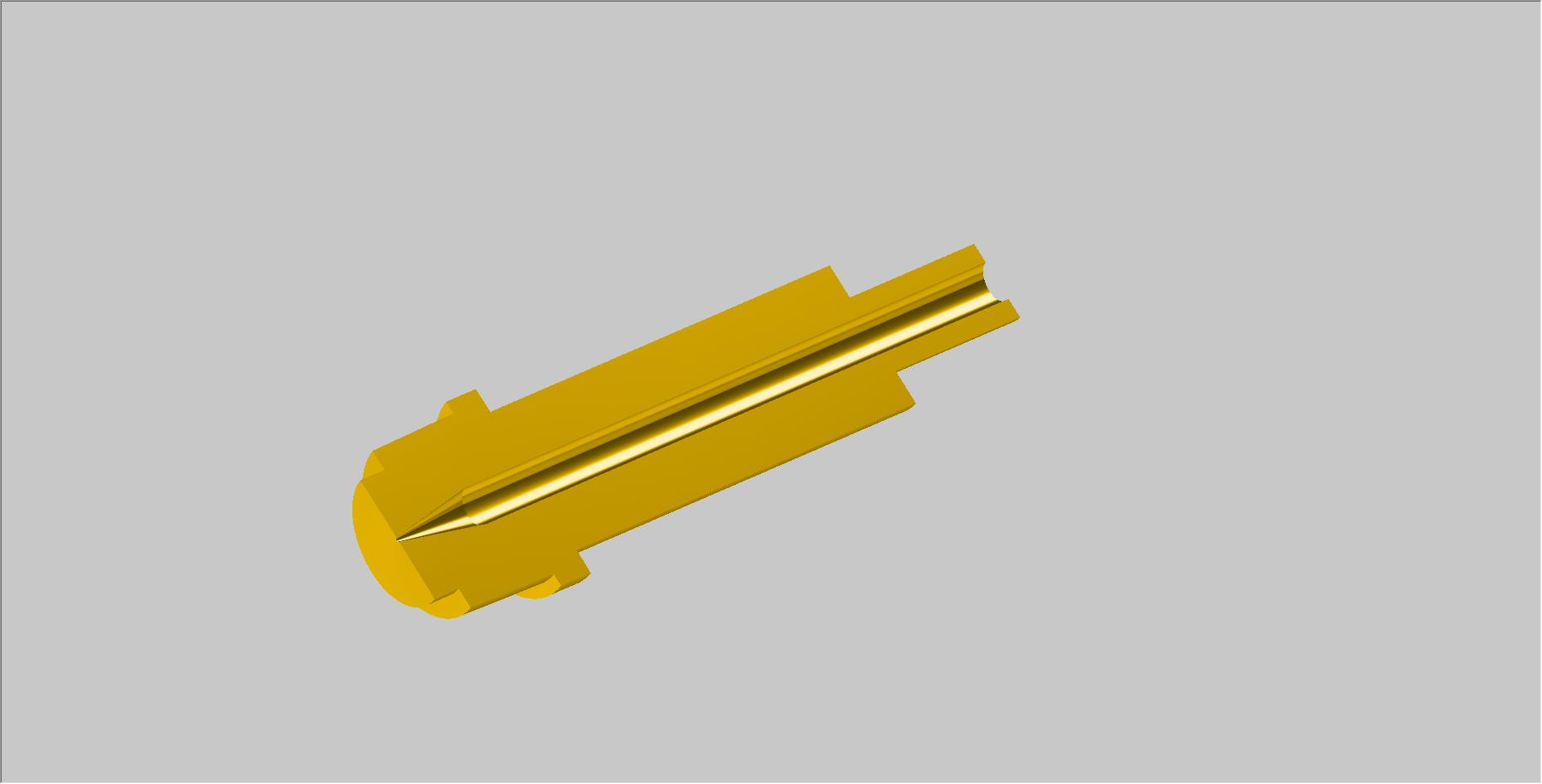
Howtek style inkjet nozzle (tubular piezo not shown)

There are many ways to produce a drop-on-demand (DOD) inkjet. Common methods include thermal DOD and piezoelectric DOD to speed up the frequency of drops. DOD may use a single nozzle or thousands of nozzles. One DOD process uses software that directs the heads to apply between zero and eight droplets of ink per dot, only where needed. Inkjet fluid materials have expanded to include pastes, epoxies, hot-melt inks, biological fluids, etc. DOD is very popular and has an interesting history. Mechanical DOD came first, followed by electrical methods including piezoelectric devices and then thermal or heat expansion methods.

Thermal DOD printing
Most consumer inkjet printers, including those from Canon (FINE Cartridge system, see photo), Hewlett-Packard, and Lexmark, use the thermal inkjet process. The idea of using thermal excitation to move tiny drops of ink was developed independently by two groups at roughly the same time: John Vaught and a team at Hewlett-Packard's Corvallis Division, and Canon engineer Ichiro Endo. Initially, in 1977, Endo's team was trying to use the piezoelectric effect to move ink out of the nozzle but noticed that ink shot out of a syringe when it was accidentally heated with a soldering iron. Vaught's work started in late 1978 with a project to develop fast, low-cost printing. The team at HP found that thin-film resistors could produce enough heat to fire an ink droplet. Two years later the HP and Canon teams found out about each other's work.
Thermal inkjet
In the thermal inkjet process, the print cartridges consist of a series of tiny chambers, each containing a heater, all of which are constructed by photolithography. To eject a droplet from each chamber, a pulse of current is passed through the heating element causing a rapid vaporization of the ink in the chamber and forming a bubble, which causes a large pressure increase, propelling a droplet of ink onto the paper (hence Canon's trade name of Bubble Jet). Early thermal heads ran at just 600–700 dpi but improvements by HP increased the firing range of 8–12 kHz per chamber and as high as 18 kHz with 5-picoliter drop volume by the year 2000. Thermal printheads do not have the power of piezo DOD or continuous inkjet, so the gap between the face of the head and paper is critical. The ink's surface tension, as well as the condensation and resultant contraction of the vapor bubble, pulls a further charge of ink into the chamber through a narrow channel attached to an ink reservoir. The inks involved are usually water-based and use either pigments or dyes as the colorant. The inks must have a volatile component to form the vapor bubble; otherwise droplet ejection cannot occur. As no special materials are required, the print head is generally cheaper to produce than in other inkjet technologies.
Piezoelectric DOD printing
Piezos are electrically polarized ceramic devices, just as a magnet is polarized. Most commercial and industrial inkjet printers and some consumer printers (those produced by Epson (see photo) and Brother Industries) use a piezoelectric material in an ink-filled chamber behind each nozzle instead of a heating element. When a voltage is applied, the piezoelectric material changes shape, generating a pressure pulse in the fluid, which pushes a droplet of ink from the nozzle. Single nozzle tubular inkjets actually are fluid resonator chambers and the drops are expelled by sound waves in the ink chamber. The 1972 patent called them squeeze tube inkjets but later it was discovered to be acoustical inkjets. Piezoelectric (also called piezo) inkjet allows a wider variety of inks than thermal inkjet as there is no requirement for a volatile component, and no issue with kogation (buildup of ink residue), but the print heads are more expensive to manufacture due to the use of piezoelectric material (usually PZT, lead zirconium titanate). However, the ink cartridges can be separate from the head itself and individually be replaced as needed. Piezo, then has the potential for lower running costs. Piezo heads are said to achieve firing rates that are faster than thermal heads at comparable drop volumes.
Piezo inkjet
Piezo inkjet technology is often used on production lines to mark products. For instance, the "use-before" date is often applied to products with this technique; in this application the head is stationary and the product moves past. This application requires a relatively large gap between the print head and the substrate, but also yields a high speed, a long service life, and low operating cost.
Thermoplastic/3D printing
In the 1970s, the first DOD inks were water-based and higher-temperature use was not recommended. In the late 1970s, wax- and oil-based inks were used in the Silonics in 1975, Siemens PT-80i in 1977 and Epson and Exxon in 1980s DOD inkjets. In 1984, a small company, Howtek, Inc., found that solid ink materials (thermoplastics) could be jetted at 125 °C (257 °F) by maintaining the piezo poling charge while printing. In 1986, Howtek launched the Pixelmaster solid ink-jetting printer, which opened the door to printing three-dimensional plastic inks and led to a 1992 3D patent, US5136515A. This patent was licensed by the first three major 3D printer companies (Sanders Prototype, Inc, Stratasys and 3D Systems).
Braillemaster
In the late 1980s, Howtek introduced the Braillemaster, a printer that used four layers of solid ink per character to create documents in Braille that could be read by people who were blind.
Howtek
Solidscape, Inc., currently uses the Howtek-style thermoplastic materials and Howtek-style single nozzle inkjets (see illustration) very successfully. Ballistic Particle Manufacturing also used the Howtek style materials and inkjets. These inkjets can produce up to 16,000 drops per second and shoot drops at 9 feet per second. Originally designed to only print on standard letter-sized paper sheets they now can print 3D models requiring hundreds of layers.
Thermojet
The thermoplastic inks in piezoelectric inkjets (called Thermojet technology by Howtek) are sometimes confused with the thermal (heat expansion) bubble-jet technology but they are completely different. Bubble jet inks are not solid at room temp and are not heated. Thermojet inks require 125 °C to reduce fluid viscosity in jetting range. Howtek was the first to introduce an inkjet color printer using thermoplastic inks in 1984 at Comdex, Las Vegas.

== Ink formulations ==
The earliest reference to a continuous inkjet ink (CIJ) in the 1971 patent US3596285A states "The preferred ink is characterized by viscosity and surface tension characteristics such that the liquid will be maintained over span under the force with which it is moving in bridge or stream. Implicit in such requirement is that the pressure applied to the ink in formation of said stream is sufficient to form a jet and to impart enough energy to carry the jet as a continuous liquid mass notwithstanding the defective forces which are or may be applied. Furthermore, the color of the ink and the color of the carrier should be such that good optical contrast is formed there between the following printing. The preferred ink is a "hot-melt ink". That is to say it will assume a solid phase at the temperature of the carrier and liquid phase at some higher temperature. The range of commercially available ink compositions which could meet the requirement of the invention are not known at the present time. However, satisfactory printing according to the invention has been achieved with a conductive metal alloy as ink. It is extremely hard at room temperature and adheres well to the surface of the carrier.

The basic problem with inkjet inks is the conflicting requirements for a coloring agent that will stay on the surface versus rapid bleed through the carrier fluid.

Desktop inkjet printers, as used in offices and homes, tend to use aqueous ink based on a mixture of water, glycol and dyes or pigments. These inks are inexpensive to manufacture but difficult to control on the surface of media, often requiring specially coated media. HP inks contain sulfonated polyazo black dye (commonly used for dyeing leather), nitrates and other compounds. Aqueous inks are mainly used in printers with thermal inkjet heads, as these heads require water to perform the ink-expelling function.

While aqueous inks often provide the broadest color gamut and most vivid color, most are not waterproof without specialized coating or lamination after printing. Most dye-based inks, while usually the least expensive, are subject to rapid fading when exposed to light or ozone. Pigment-based aqueous inks are typically more costly but provide much better long-term durability and ultraviolet resistance. This increased resistance is one of the reasons pigment-based inks are commonly used in fine-art and archival printing applications. Inks marketed as "archival quality" are usually pigment-based.

Some professional wide format printers use aqueous inks, but the majority in professional use today employ a much wider range of inks, most of which require piezo inkjet heads and extensive maintenance.

Solvent inks
The main ingredient of these inks are volatile organic compounds (VOCs), organic chemical compounds that have high vapor pressures. Color is achieved with pigments rather than dyes for excellent fade-resistance. The chief advantage of solvent inks is that they are comparatively inexpensive and enable printing on flexible, uncoated vinyl substrates, which are used to produce vehicle graphics, billboards, banners and adhesive decals. Disadvantages include the vapor produced by the solvent and the need to dispose of used solvent. Unlike most aqueous inks, prints made using solvent-based inks are generally waterproof and ultraviolet-resistant (for outdoor use) without special over-coatings. The high print speed of many solvent printers demands special drying equipment, usually a combination of heaters and blowers. The substrate is usually heated immediately before and after the print heads apply ink. Solvent inks are divided into two sub-categories: hard solvent ink offers the greatest durability without specialized over-coatings but requires specialized ventilation of the printing area to avoid exposure to hazardous fumes, while mild or "eco" solvent inks, while still not as safe as aqueous inks, are intended for use in enclosed spaces without specialized ventilation of the printing area. Mild solvent inks have rapidly gained popularity in recent years as their color quality and durability have increased while ink cost has dropped significantly.
UV-curable inks
These inks consist mainly of acrylic monomers with an initiator package. After printing, the ink is cured by exposure to strong UV light. Ink is exposed to UV radiation where a chemical reaction takes place where the photo-initiators cause the ink components to cross-link into a solid. Typically a shuttered mercury-vapor lamp or UV LED is used for the curing process. Curing processes with high power for short periods of times (microseconds) allow curing inks on thermally sensitive substrates. UV inks do not evaporate, but rather cure or set as a result from this chemical reaction. No material is evaporated or removed, which means about 100% of the delivered volume is used to provide coloration. This reaction happens very quickly, which leads to instant drying that results in a completely cured graphic in a matter of seconds. This also allows for a very fast print process. As a result of this instant chemical reaction no solvents penetrate the substrate once it comes off the printer, which allows for high quality prints. The advantage of UV-curable inks is that they "dry" as soon as they are cured, they can be applied to a wide range of uncoated substrates, and they produce a very robust image. Disadvantages are that they are expensive, require expensive curing modules in the printer, and the cured ink has a significant volume and so gives a slight relief on the surface. Though improvements are being made in the technology, UV-curable inks, because of their volume, are somewhat susceptible to cracking if applied to a flexible substrate. As such, they are often used in large "flatbed" printers, which print directly to rigid substrates such as plastic, wood or aluminium where flexibility is not a concern.
Dye sublimation inks
These inks contain special sublimation dyes and are used to print directly or indirectly on to fabrics which consist of a high percentage of polyester fibers. A heating step causes the dyes to sublimate into the fibers and create an image with strong color and good durability.
Solid ink
These inks consist mainly of waxy compounds which are heated past their melting point to enable printing, and which harden upon hitting the cooled substrate. Hot-melt inks are typically used for masking processes and are found in graphic printing. The earliest hot-melt ink was patented in 1971 by Johannes F Gottwald, US3596285A, Liquid Metal Recorder was intended for printing. The patent states "As used herein the term "printing" is not intended in a limited sense but includes writing or other symbol or pattern formulation with an ink. The term ink as used is intended to include not only dye or pigment-containing materials, but any flowable substance or composition suited for application to surface for forming symbols, characters or patterns of intelligence by marking. The materials employed in such process can be salvaged for reuse. Another object of the invention is to increase the size of characters.....in terms of material requirements for such large and continuous displays".

== Print heads ==
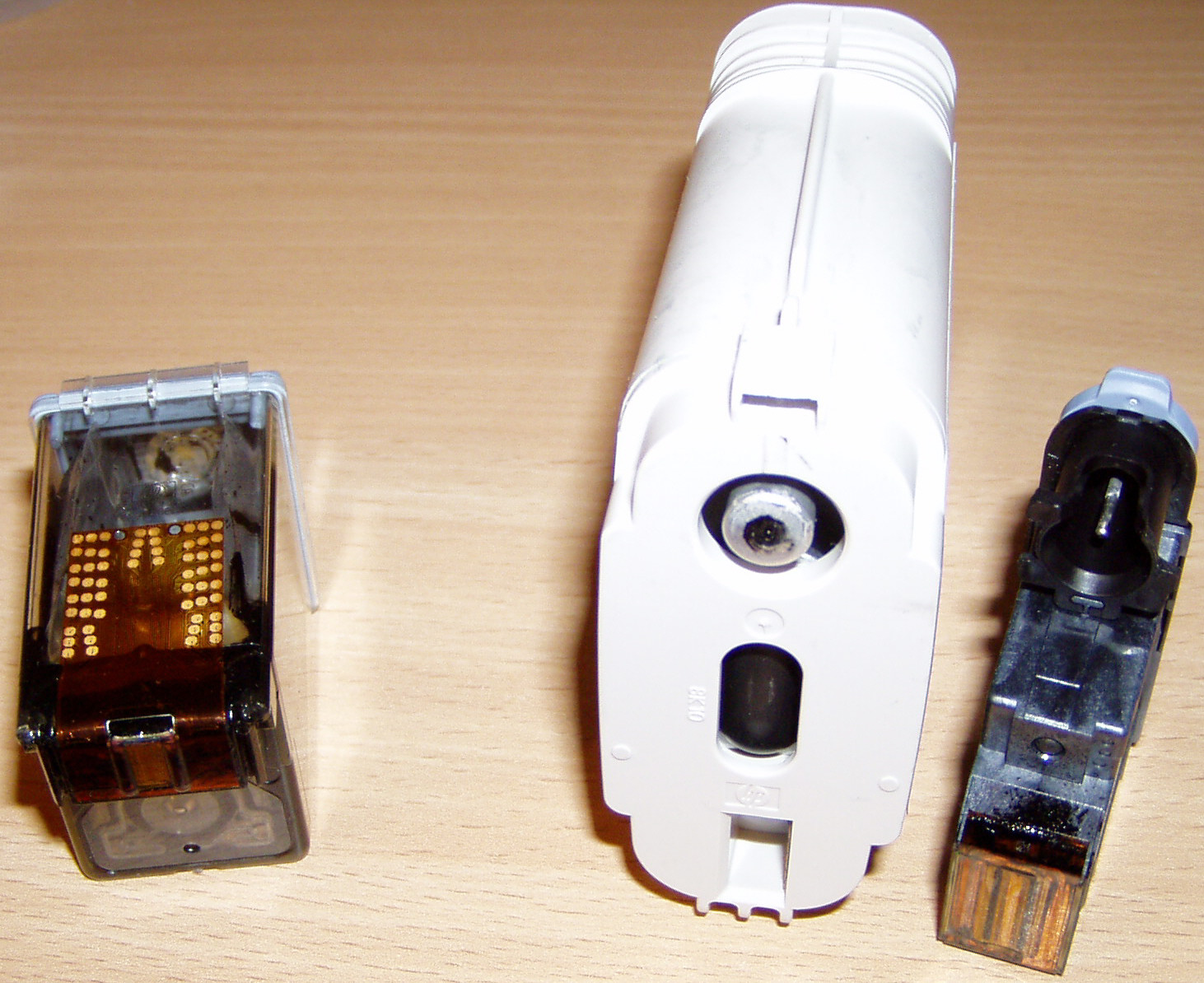
Inkjet heads: disposable head (left) and fixed head (right) with ink cartridge (middle)

There are two main design approaches in inkjet head design: fixed head and disposable head.

=== Fixed head ===
The fixed-head approach uses a print head that is designed to last for the life of the printer. The idea is that because the head need not be replaced every time the ink runs out, consumable costs can be made lower and the head itself can be more precise than a cheap disposable one. On the other hand, if a fixed head is damaged, obtaining a replacement head can become expensive, if removing and replacing the head is even possible. If the print head cannot be removed, the printer itself will then need to be replaced.

Fixed-head designs are available in consumer products, but are more commonly found on industrial high-end printers and large format printers. In the consumer space, fixed-head printers are manufactured primarily by Epson, Brother, and Canon; however, many more recent Hewlett-Packard models use a fixed head, such as the Officejet Pro 8620 and HP's Pagewide series.

=== Disposable head ===
The disposable head approach uses a print head which is supplied as a part of a replaceable ink cartridge. Every time a cartridge is exhausted, the entire cartridge, including the print head, is replaced with a new one. This adds to the cost of consumables and makes it more difficult to manufacture a high-precision head at a reasonable cost, but also means that a damaged or clogged print head is only a minor problem: the user can simply buy a new cartridge. Hewlett-Packard has traditionally favored the disposable print head, as did Canon in its early models. This type of construction can also be seen as an effort by printer manufacturers to stem third party ink cartridge assembly replacements, as these would-be suppliers do not have the ability to manufacture specialized print heads.

An intermediate method does exist: a disposable ink tank connected to a disposable head, which is replaced infrequently (perhaps every tenth ink tank or so). Most high-volume Hewlett-Packard inkjet printers use this setup, with the disposable print heads used on lower volume models. A similar approach is used by Kodak, where the printhead intended for permanent use is nevertheless inexpensive and can be replaced by the user. Canon now uses (in most models) replaceable print heads which are designed to last the life of the printer, but can be replaced by the user should they become clogged.

=== Cleaning mechanisms ===
Video: covering the printhead nozzles with a rubber cap

The primary cause of inkjet printing problems is ink drying on the printhead's nozzles, causing the pigments and dyes to dry out and form a solid block of hardened mass that plugs the microscopic ink passageways. Most printers attempt to prevent this drying from occurring by covering the printhead nozzles with a rubber cap when the printer is not in use. Abrupt power losses, or unplugging the printer before it has capped the printhead, can cause the printhead to be left in an uncapped state. Even when the head is capped, this seal is not perfect, and over a period of several weeks the moisture (or other solvent) can still seep out, causing the ink to dry and harden. Once ink begins to collect and harden, the drop volume can be affected, drop trajectory can change, or the nozzle can completely fail to jet ink.

To combat this drying, nearly all inkjet printers include a mechanism to reapply moisture to the printhead. Typically there is no separate supply of pure ink-free solvent available to do this job, and so instead the ink itself is used to remoisten the printhead. The printer attempts to fire all nozzles at once, and as the ink sprays out, some of it wicks across the printhead to the dry channels and partially softens the hardened ink. After spraying, a rubber wiper blade is swept across the printhead to spread the moisture evenly across the printhead, and all jets are again fired to dislodge any ink clumps blocking the channels.

Some printers use a supplemental air-suction pump, using the rubber capping station to suck ink through a severely clogged cartridge. The suction pump mechanism is frequently driven by the page feed stepper motor: it is connected to the end of the shaft. The pump only engages when the shaft turns backwards, hence the rollers reversing while head cleaning. Due to the built-in head design, the suction pump is also needed to prime the ink channels inside a new printer, and to reprime the channels between ink tank changes.

Professional solvent- and UV-curable ink wide-format inkjet printers generally include a "manual clean" mode that allows the operator to manually clean the print heads and capping mechanism and to replace the wiper blades and other parts used in the automated cleaning processes. The volume of ink used in these printers often leads to "overspray" and therefore buildup of dried ink in many places that automated processes are not capable of cleaning.

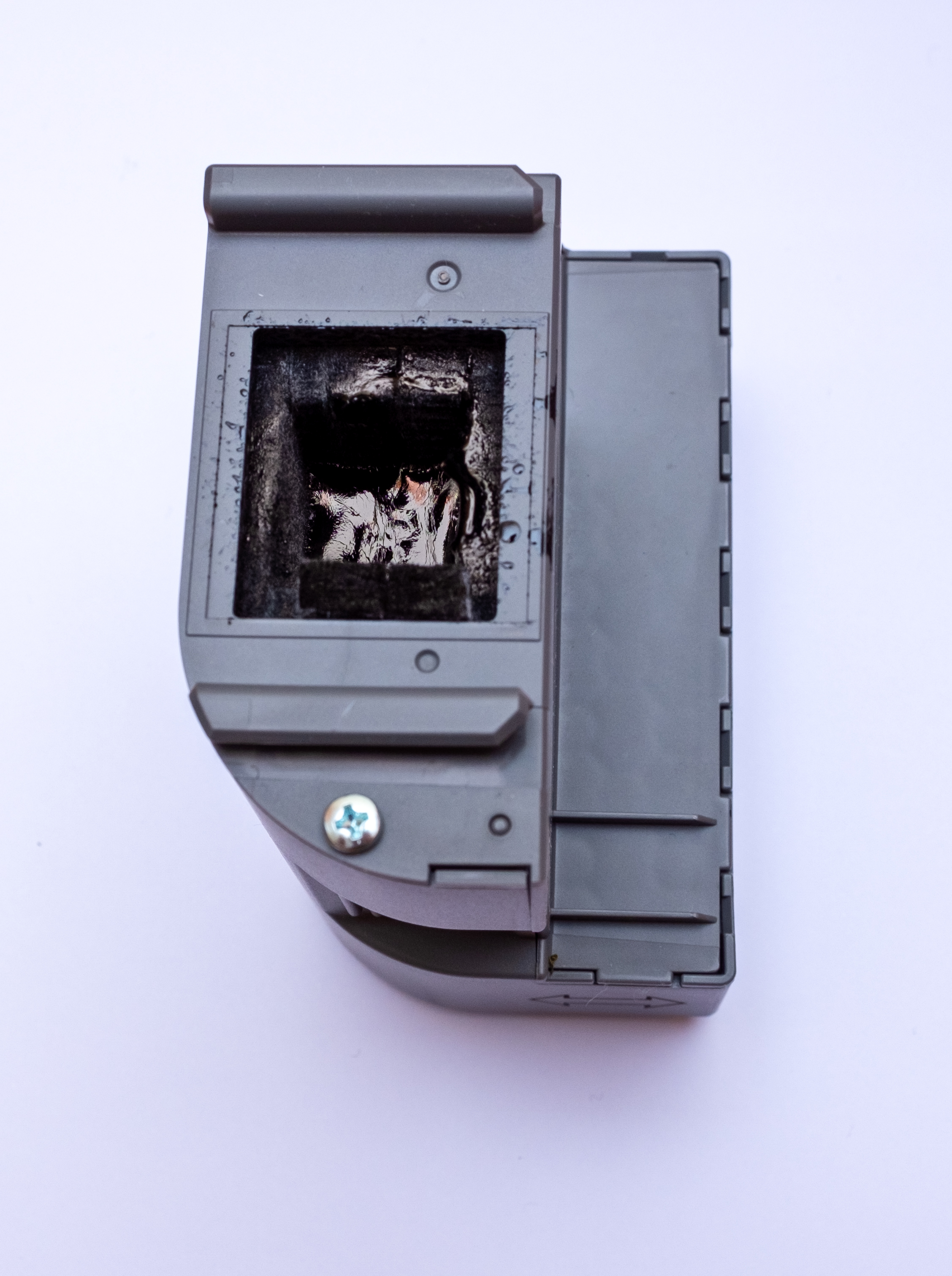
Epson Maintenance box full of used ink

The ink consumed in the cleaning process needs to be collected to prevent ink from leaking in the printer. The collection area is called the spittoon, and in Hewlett-Packard printers this is an open plastic tray underneath the cleaning/wiping station. In Epson printers, there is typically a large absorption pad in a pan underneath the paper feed platen. For printers that are several years old, it is common for the dried ink in the spittoon to form a pile that can stack up and touch the printheads, jamming the printer. Some larger professional printers using solvent inks may employ a replaceable plastic receptacle to contain waste ink and solvent, which must be emptied or replaced when full.

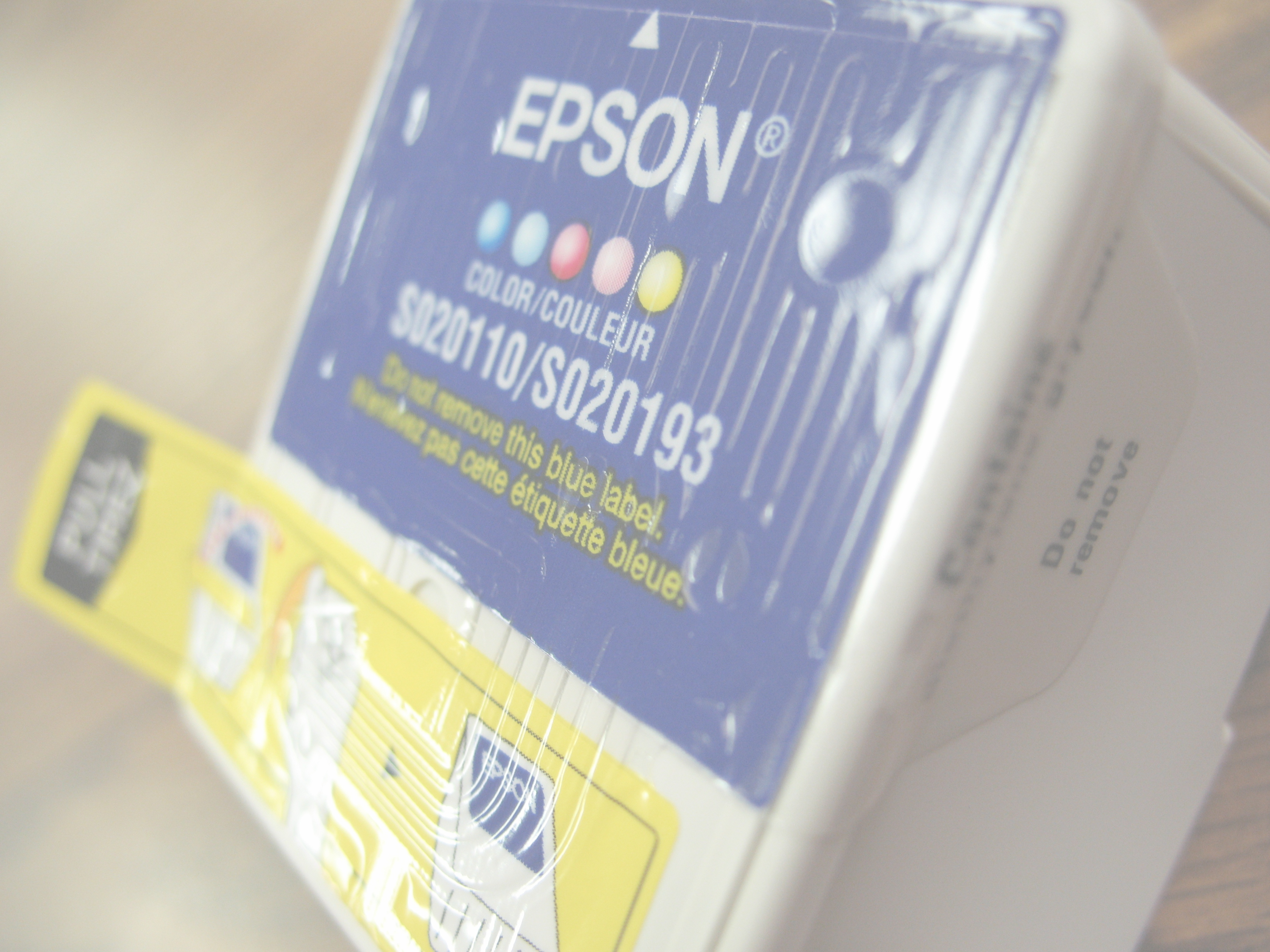
Labyrinth air vent tubes on the top of an Epson Stylus Photo 5-color ink tank. The long air channels are molded into the top of the tank and the blue label seals the channels into long tubes. The yellow label is removed prior to installation, and opens the tube ends to the atmosphere so that ink can be sprayed onto the paper. Removing the blue label would destroy the tubes and cause the moisture to quickly evaporate.

There is a second type of ink drying that most printers are unable to prevent. For ink to spray from the cartridge, air must enter to displace the removed ink. The air enters via an extremely long, thin labyrinth tube, up to 10 cm (3.9 in) long, wrapping back and forth across the ink tank. The channel is long and narrow to reduce moisture evaporation through the vent tube, but some evaporation still occurs and eventually the ink cartridge dries up from the inside out. To combat this problem, which is especially acute with professional fast-drying solvent inks, many wide-format printer cartridge designs contain the ink in an airtight, collapsible bag that requires no vent. The bag merely shrinks until the cartridge is empty.

The frequent cleaning conducted by some printers can consume quite a bit of ink and has a great impact on cost-per-page determinations.

Clogged nozzles can be detected by printing a standard test pattern on the page. Some software workaround methods are known for rerouting printing information from a clogged nozzle to a working nozzle.

=== Ink delivery developments ===
Ink cartridges have been the traditional method for delivering ink to the printhead. Continuous ink system (CISS) inkjet printers connect the printhead either to high-capacity ink tanks or packs, or replenish the built-in cartridges via external tanks connected via tubes, typically a retrofit configuration. Supertank printers–a subset of CISS printers–have high-capacity integrated ink tanks or ink packs, and are manually refilled via ink bottles. When supertank ink systems are paired with disposable printhead technology, replaceable cartridges are used to replace the exhausted print heads.

== Advantages ==
Compared to earlier consumer-oriented color printers, inkjet printers have a number of advantages. They are quieter in operation than impact dot matrix or daisywheel printers. They can print finer, smoother details through higher resolution. Consumer inkjet printers with photographic print quality are widely available.

In comparison to technologies like thermal wax, dye sublimation, and laser printing, inkjets have the advantage of practically no warm up time, and often lower cost per page. However, low-cost laser printers can have lower per-page costs, at least for black-and-white printing, and possibly for color.

For some inkjet printers, monochrome ink sets are available either from the printer manufacturer or from third-party suppliers. These allow the inkjet printer to compete with the silver-based photographic papers traditionally used in black-and-white photography, and provide the same range of tones: neutral, "warm" or "cold". When switching between full-color and monochrome ink sets, it is necessary to flush out the old ink from the print head with a cleaning cartridge. Special software or at least a modified device driver are usually required, to deal with the different color mapping.

Some types of industrial inkjet printers are now capable of printing at very high speeds, in wide formats, or for a variety of industrial applications ranging from signage, textiles, optical media, ceramics and 3D printing into biomedical applications and conductive circuitry.

== Disadvantages ==
Many "intelligent" ink cartridges contain a microchip that communicates the estimated ink level to the printer; this may cause the printer to display an error message, or incorrectly inform the user that the ink cartridge is empty. In some cases, these messages can be ignored, but some inkjet printers will refuse to print with a cartridge that declares itself empty, to prevent consumers from refilling cartridges. For example, Epson embeds a chip which prevents printing when the chip claims the cartridge is empty, although a researcher who over-rode the system found that in one case he could print up to 38% more good quality pages, even though the chip stated that the cartridge was empty. Third-party ink suppliers sell ink cartridges at significant discounts (at least 10–30% off OEM cartridge prices, sometimes up to 95%, typically averaging around 50%), and also bulk ink and cartridge self-refill kits at even lower prices. Many vendors' "intelligent" ink cartridges have been reverse-engineered. It is now possible to buy inexpensive devices to reliably reset such cartridges to report themselves as full, so that they may be refilled many times.

The very narrow inkjet nozzles are prone to clogging. The ink consumed in cleaning them—either during cleaning invoked by the user, or in many cases, performed automatically by the printer on a routine schedule—can account for a significant proportion of the ink used in the machine. Inkjet printing head nozzles can be cleaned using specialized solvents, or by soaking in warm distilled water for short periods of time (for water-soluble inks.)

The high cost of OEM ink cartridges and the intentional obstacles to refilling them have been addressed by the growth of third-party ink suppliers. Many printer manufacturers discourage customers from using third-party inks, stating that they can damage the print heads due to not being the same formulation as the OEM inks, cause leaks, and produce inferior-quality output (e.g., of incorrect color gamut). Consumer Reports has noted that some third-party cartridges may contain less ink than OEM cartridges, and thus yield no cost savings, while Wilhelm Imaging Research claims that with third-party inks the lifetime of prints may be considerably reduced. However, an April 2007 review showed that, in a double-blind test, reviewers generally preferred the output produced using third-party ink over OEM ink. In general, OEM inks have undergone significant system reliability testing with the cartridge and print-head materials, whereas R&D efforts on third-party ink material compatibility are likely to be significantly less. Some inkjet manufacturers have tried to prevent cartridges being refilled using various schemes including fitting chips to the cartridges that log how much the cartridge has printed and prevent the operation of a refilled cartridge.

The warranty on a printer may not apply if the printer is damaged by the use of non-approved supplies. In the US the Magnuson–Moss Warranty Act is a federal law which states that warrantors cannot require that only brand name parts and supplies be used with their products, as some printer manufacturers imply. However, this would not apply if non-approved items cause damage.

== Durability ==
Inkjet documents can have poor to excellent archival durability, depending on the quality of the inks and paper used. If low-quality paper is used, it can yellow and degrade due to residual acid in the untreated pulp; in the worst case, old prints can literally crumble into small particles when handled. High-quality inkjet prints on acid-free paper can last as long as typewritten or handwritten documents on the same paper.

Because the ink used in many low-cost consumer inkjets is water-soluble, care must be taken with inkjet-printed documents to avoid even the smallest drop of moisture, which can cause severe "blurring" or "running". In extreme cases, even sweaty fingertips during hot humid weather could cause low-quality inks to smear. Similarly, water-based highlighter markers can blur inkjet-printed documents and discolor the highlighter's tip. The lifetime of inkjet prints produced using aqueous inks is generally shorter (although UV-resistant inks are available) than those produced with solvent-based inkjets; however, so-called "archival inks" have been produced for use in aqueous-based machines which offer extended life.

In addition to smearing, gradual fading of many inks can be a problem over time. Print lifetime is highly dependent on the quality and formulation of the ink. The earliest inkjet printers, intended for home and small office applications, used dye-based inks. Even the best dye-based inks are not as durable as pigment-based inks, which are now available for many inkjet printers. Many inkjet printers now utilize pigment based inks which are highly water resistant: at least the black ink is often pigment-based. Resin or silicone protected photopaper is widely available at low cost, introducing complete water and mechanical rub resistance for dye and pigment inks. The photopaper itself must be designed for pigment or for dye inks, as pigment particles are too large to be able to penetrate through dye-only photopaper protection layer.

The highest-quality inkjet prints are often called "giclée" prints, to distinguish them from less-durable and lower-cost prints. However, the use of the term is no guarantee of quality, and the inks and paper used must be carefully investigated before an archivist can rely on their long-term durability.

== Operating cost tradeoffs ==
Inkjets use solvent-based inks which have much shorter expiration dates compared to laser toner, which has an indefinite shelf life. Inkjet printers tend to clog if not used regularly, whereas laser printers are much more tolerant of intermittent use. Inkjet printers require periodical head cleaning, which consumes a considerable amount of ink, and will drive printing costs higher especially if the printer is unused for long periods.

If an inkjet head becomes clogged, third-party ink solvents/head cleaners and replacement heads are available in some cases. The cost of such items may be less expensive compared to a transfer unit for a laser printer, but the laser printer unit has a much longer lifetime between required maintenance. Many inkjet printer models now have permanently installed heads, which cannot be economically replaced if they become irreversibly clogged, resulting in scrapping of the entire printer. On the other hand, inkjet printer designs which use a disposable printhead usually cost significantly more per page than printers using permanent heads. By contrast, laser printers do not have printheads to clog or replace frequently, and usually can produce many more pages between maintenance intervals.

Inkjet printers have traditionally produced better quality output than color laser printers when printing photographic material. Both technologies have improved dramatically over time, although the highest-quality giclée prints favored by artists use what is essentially a high-quality specialized type of inkjet printer.

== Business model ==
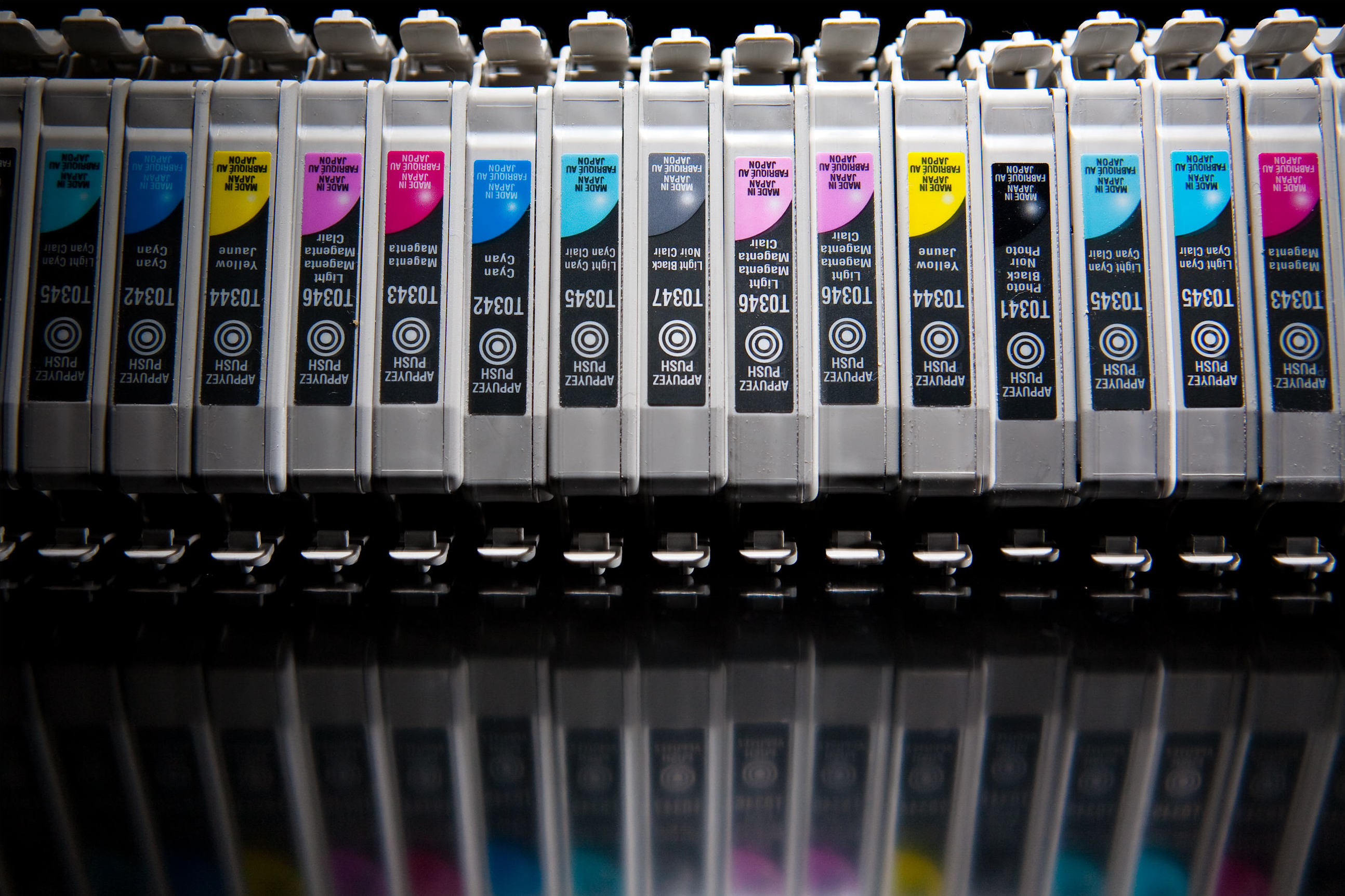
Ink cartridges

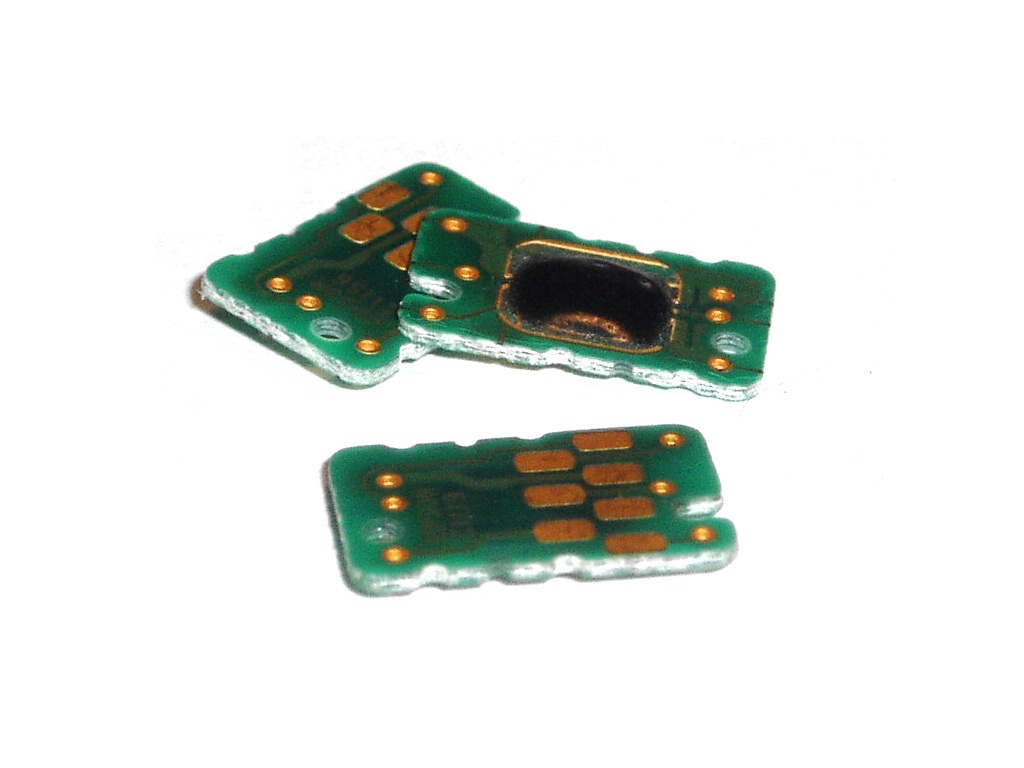
Microchips from Epson ink cartridges. These are tiny printed circuit boards; a deposit of black epoxy covers the chip itself.

A common business model for inkjet printers involves selling the actual printer at or below production cost, while dramatically marking up the price of the (proprietary) ink cartridges (a profit model called the "razor and blades model"). Most current inkjet printers attempt to enforce this product tying by anticompetitive measures such as microchips in the cartridges to hinder the use of third-party or refilled ink cartridges. The microchips monitor usage and report the ink remaining to the printer. Some manufacturers also impose "expiration dates". When the chip reports that the cartridge is empty (or out of date) the printer stops printing. Even if the cartridge is refilled, the microchip will indicate to the printer that the cartridge is depleted. For many models (especially from Canon), the 'empty' status can be overridden by entering a 'service code' (or sometimes simply by pressing the 'start' button again). For some printers, special circuit "flashers" are available that reset the quantity of remaining ink to the maximum.

Some manufacturers, most notably Epson and Hewlett-Packard, have been accused of indicating that a cartridge is depleted while a substantial amount of ink remains. A 2007 study found that most printers waste a significant quantity of ink when they declare a cartridge to be empty. Single-ink cartridges were found to have on average 20% of their ink remaining, though actual figures range from 9% to 64% of the cartridge's total ink capacity, depending on the brand and model of printer. This problem is further compounded with the use of one-piece multi-ink cartridges, which are declared empty as soon as one color runs low. Of great annoyance to many users are those printers that will refuse to print documents requiring only black ink, just because one or more of the color ink cartridges is depleted.

In recent years, many consumers have begun to challenge the business practices of printer manufacturers, such as charging up to US$8,000 per gallon (US$2,100 per liter) for printer ink. Alternatives for consumers are cheaper copies of cartridges, produced by third parties, and the refilling of cartridges, using refill kits. Due to the large differences in price caused by OEM markups, there are many companies selling third-party ink cartridges. Most printer manufacturers discourage refilling disposable cartridges or using aftermarket copy cartridges, and say that use of incorrect inks may cause poor image quality due to differences in viscosity, which can affect the amount of ink ejected in a drop, and color consistency, and can damage the printhead. Nonetheless, the use of alternative cartridges and inks has been gaining in popularity, threatening the business model of printer manufacturers. Printer companies such as HP, Lexmark, and Epson have used patents and the DMCA to launch lawsuits against third-party vendors. An anti-trust class-action lawsuit was launched in the US against HP and office supply chain Staples, alleging that HP paid Staples $100 million to keep inexpensive third-party ink cartridges off the shelves.

In Lexmark Int'l v. Static Control Components, the United States Court of Appeals for the Sixth Circuit ruled that circumvention of this technique does not violate the Digital Millennium Copyright Act. The European Commission also ruled this practice anticompetitive: it will disappear in newer models sold in the European Union. Patents protecting the structure of their cartridges prevent the sale of cheaper copies of the cartridges. For some printer models (notably those from Canon), the manufacturer's own microchip can be removed and fitted to a compatible cartridge thereby avoiding the need to replicate the microchip (and risk prosecution). Other manufacturers embed their microchips deep within the cartridge in an effort to prevent this approach.

In 2007, Eastman Kodak entered the inkjet market with its own line of All-In-One printers based on a marketing model that differed from the prevailing practice of selling the printer at a loss while making large profits on replacement ink cartridges. Kodak claimed that consumers could save up to 50 percent on printing by using its lower-cost cartridges filled with the company's proprietary pigmented colorants while avoiding the potential problems associated with off-brand inks. This strategy proved unsuccessful, and Kodak exited the consumer inkjet printer business in 2012.

A more recent development is the supertank printer, which uses an integrated continuous ink system. Supertank printers are defined by their large, permanently installed ink tanks which are filled from ink bottles. The printer itself is typically sold at a substantial premium, but ink bottles are inexpensive and contain enough ink to print thousands of pages. Supertank printers generally ship with full bottles of ink in the box, allowing up to two years of printing before the tanks needs to be refilled. Epson pioneered this technology by launching the EcoTank range, first in Indonesia in 2010, with a North American launch in 2015. The supertank concept proved commercially successful, and Canon and HP launched their own lines of supertank printers, under the names MegaTank (Canon) and Smart Tank (HP).

=== Region-coding of printers and ink cartridges ===
Many manufacturers give their printers and cartridges region codes, comparable to those of DVDs, so customers cannot import them from a cheaper region. The region code can be changed a few times by the customer or the customer-service department of the manufacturer, but then, the printer is region-locked like a RPC-2 DVD drive.

One method to bypass printer-region-coding is to store empty cartridges from the old region and refill them with ink from the new region, but, as mentioned above, many modern ink cartridges have chips and sensors to prevent refilling, which makes the process more difficult. On the Internet, there are refill instructions for different printer models available. Another method is to have ink cartridges from the old region shipped to the new region.

Some manufacturers of region-coded printers also offer region-free printers specially designed for travelers.

== Printer types ==
=== Professional models ===
In addition to the widely used small inkjet printers for home and office, there are professional inkjet printers, some for "page-width" format printing and many for wide format printing. Page-width format means that the print width ranges from about 8.5–37 in (22–94 cm). "Wide format" means print width ranging from 24" up to 15' (about 60 cm to 5m). The most common application of page-width printers is in printing high-volume business communications that do not need high-quality layout and color. Particularly with the addition of variable data technologies, the page-width printers are important in billing, tagging, and individualized catalogs and newspapers. The application of most wide format printers is in printing advertising graphics; a lower-volume application is printing of design documents by architects or engineers. But nowadays, there are inkjet printers for digital textile printing up to 64" wide with good high definition image of 1440×720 dpi.

Another specialty application for inkjets is producing prepress color proofs for printing jobs created digitally. Such printers are designed to give accurate color rendition of how the final image will look (a "proof") when the job is finally produced on a large volume press such as a four-color offset lithography press. An example is an Iris printer, whose output is what the French term giclée was coined for.

The largest-volume supplier is Hewlett-Packard, which supplies over 90 percent of the market for printers for printing technical drawings. The major products in their Designjet series are the Designjet 500/800, the Designjet T Printer series (including the T1100 and T610), the Designjet 1050 and the Designjet 4000/4500. They also have the HP Designjet 5500, a six-color printer that is used especially for printing graphics as well as the new Designjet Z6100 which sits at the top of the HP Designjet range and features an eight color pigment ink system.

Epson, Kodak, and Canon also manufacture wide-format printers, sold in much smaller numbers than standard printers. Epson has a group of three Japanese companies around it that predominantly use Epson piezo printheads and inks: Mimaki, Roland, and Mutoh.

Scitex Digital Printing developed high-speed, variable-data, inkjet printers for production printing, but sold its profitable assets associated with the technology to Kodak in 2005 who now market the printers as Kodak Versamark VJ1000, VT3000, and VX5000 printing systems. These roll-fed printers can print at up to 305m per minute.

Professional high-volume inkjet printers are made by a range of companies. These printers can range in price from US$35,000 to $2 million. Carriage widths on these units can range from 54" to 192" (about 1.4 to 5 m), and ink technologies have tended toward solvent, eco-solvent, and UV-curing with a more recent focus toward water-based (aqueous) ink sets. Major applications where these printers are used are for outdoor settings for billboards, truck sides and truck curtains, building graphics and banners, while indoor displays include point-of-sales displays, backlit displays, exhibition graphics, and museum graphics.

The major suppliers for professional high-volume, wide- and grand-format printers include: EFI, LexJet, Grapo, Inca, Durst, Océ, NUR (now part of Hewlett-Packard), Lüscher, VUTEk, Scitex Vision (now part of Hewlett-Packard), Mutoh, Mimaki, Roland DG, Seiko I Infotech, IQDEMY, Leggett and Platt, Agfa, Raster Printers, DGI and MacDermid ColorSpan (now part of Hewlett-Packard), swissqprint, SPGPrints (formerly Stork Prints), MS Printing Systems and Digital Media Warehouse.

=== SOHO multifunction inkjet photo printers ===
SOHO multifunction inkjet printers for photo printing use up to 6 different inks:

- Canon: cyan, yellow, magenta, black, pigment black, gray. 1 pl thermal.
- Epson: cyan, yellow, magenta, light cyan, light magenta, black. 1.5 pl piezo variable. Also with A3 paper printing, or FAX and duplex ADF.

=== Professional inkjet photo printers ===
Inkjet printers for professional photo printing use up to twelve different inks:

- Canon: photo magenta, photo cyan, yellow, magenta, cyan, red, photo black, matte black, grey, plus either blue, photo gray, and one chroma optimiser for black density and uniform glossiness, or light gray, dark gray and one chroma optimiser, or green, blue, and photo gray. 4 pl thermal.
- Epson (10 colors from 12): vivid magenta, yellow, cyan, orange, green, vivid light magenta, light cyan, light black, matte black or photo black, plus an irreversible choice of either light light gray or violet (V not for photo). 3.5 pl piezo variable.
- HP: magenta, yellow, red, green, blue, light magenta, light cyan, gray, light gray, matte black, photo black, and one gloss enhancer. 4 pl thermal.

They can print an image of 36 megapixels on A3 borderless photo paper with 444 ppi.

=== Compact photo printers ===
A compact photo printer is a stand-alone inkjet printer designed to produce 4×6 or 2×3 inch prints from digital cameras. It works without the use of a computer. It is also known as a portable photo printer or a snapshot printer. Compact photo printers came on the market shortly after the popularity of home photo printing took off in the early 2000s. They were designed as an alternative to developing photos or printing them on a standard inkjet photo printer.

The majority of compact photo printers can only print 4 in × 6 in (100 mm × 150 mm) pictures. Given this limitation, they are not meant to replace standard inkjets. Many manufacturers advertise the cost per page of photos printed on their machines; this theoretically convinces people that they can print their own pictures just as cheaply as retail stores or through online printing services. Most compact photo printers share a similar design. They are small units, usually with large LCDs in order to allow people to browse and edit their photos, as can be done on a computer. The editing options are usually somewhat advanced, allowing the user to crop photos, remove red eye, adjust color settings as well as other functions. Compact photo printers typically feature a large number of connection options, including USB and most memory card formats.

Compact photo printers are currently manufactured by most of the leading printer manufacturers such as Epson, Canon, HP, Lexmark and Kodak. While they have increased in popularity in recent years, they still make up a relatively small share of the inkjet printer market. LG's Pocket Photo uses Zink thermal paper which has chemistries embedded on each inkless photo paper and the image will appear with the heat.

== Other uses ==
U.S. Patent 6,319,530 describes a "Method of photocopying an image onto an edible web for decorating iced baked goods". In other words, this invention enables one to inkjet print a food-grade color photograph on a birthday cake's surface. Many bakeries now carry these types of decorations, which are printable using edible inks and dedicated inkjet printers. Edible ink printing can be done using normal home use inkjet printers like Canon Bubble Jet printers with edible ink cartridges installed, and using rice paper or frosting sheets.

Inkjet printers and similar technologies are used in the production of many microscopic items. See Microelectromechanical systems.

Inkjet printers are used to form conductive traces for circuits, and color filters in LCD and plasma displays.

Inkjet printers, especially models produced by Dimatix (now part of Fujifilm), Xennia Technology and Pixdro, are in fairly common use in many labs around the world for developing alternative deposition methods that reduce consumption of expensive, rare, or problematic materials. These printers have been used in the printing of polymer, macromolecular, quantum dot, metallic nanoparticles, and carbon nanotubes. The applications of such printing methods include organic thin-film transistors, organic light emitting diodes, organic solar cells, and sensors.

Inkjet technology is used in the emerging field of bioprinting. They are also used for the production of OLED displays.

== See also ==
- Supertank printer
- Edgeline printing
- Inkjet solar cell
- Inkjet technology
- Inkjet transfer
- Intelligent Interweaving technology
- ISO Standards for color ink jet printers
- Laser printing
- Memjet
- Microfluidics
- Society for Imaging Science and Technology
- Tonejet
- UV pinning
- Water-jet printer
