= Industrial digital printer =

Type of printers

Industrial Digital Printers can be divided into a variety of different categories. As the industry becomes more mature, and the number of manufacturers increases, the line between the broad descriptions becomes less defined.

Digital Printers are sometimes erroneously referred to as being “Digital Printing Presses”. The term Printing Press refers to the nature of the process, in which there is contact between the system that applies the ink to the substrate and substrate that the ink is pressed onto. Digital Printers however are non-impact printing processes; to print, a devices “fires” drops of ink from the print heads onto the substrate.

== Categories ==
Here is a broad outline of classes of digital printers in the graphic arts segment of the printing industry.

=== High volume ===
These systems print at speeds measured at between 200 and 400 square metres per hour.

=== Super wide format ===
These printers are generally roll-to-roll and have a print bed that is 2m to 5m wide. Mostly used for printing billboards and generally have the capability of printing between 60 and 160 square metres per hour. Traditionally these were manufactured by Western manufacturers, however in the last 5 to 10 years Korean, Japanese and Chinese printer manufacturers have been aggressively competing in this category with more reliable faster printers. Margins dictate that many well-known European brands are currently manufactured in the East and simply rebranded in Europe and the United States for distribution around the world. Market antipathy to products manufactured in the East is becoming obsolescent as the vast majority of products used commercially are either assembled complete in the East or have their parts manufactured and exported from there. The low manufacturing costs of parts and machines in the East would make it extremely difficult for super-wide format digital printer suppliers around the world to compete profitably unless they turned to countries like China, Korea and Japan for their manufacturing.

=== Wide format ===
These printers are most commonly manufactured in Korea and China with India starting to develop printers as well. These machines are now available from 0.9 metres to 3 metres wide. Generally they are capable of printing from 10 to 60 square metres per hour.

=== High resolution ===
Printers are generally referred to as "Super-Wide format" when their print bed exceeds 2.2m in width. For many applications at this size resolution becomes secondary to print speed - which is why many machines over 3m wide are designed for speed over resolution. In the 1980s billboards were generally printed at resolutions as low as 80dpi (dots per inch). Resolutions today are much higher because of the improvements in technology but printing billboards, vehicle graphics, building wraps and the like do not require the ultra-high resolutions of 1440dpi and upwards often associated with standard wide format printers. It is normal for super-wide format digital printers to function at maximum resolutions of between 540dpi and around 1040dpi. However even these resolutions are rarely used in a production environment, billboards and building wraps for example are often done at between 200dpi and 350dpi and the result relies on the viewing distance for the impactful, colourful graphics the public sees on roadsides and buildings. The fact that they are capable of printing at these higher resolutions is still important though because it attests to the size of the ink droplet being laid down by the inkjet solvent and eco-solvent machines. These ink droplets are measured in pica-litres and a print done at 200dpi will look more defined if it is printed with smaller ink droplets when compared to a machine laying down bigger ink droplets. The primary print head technologies used in ultra-wide format digital outdoor printing comes down to a few print head manufacturers worldwide including (but not restricted to) Piezo, Seiko and Spectra as the primary competitors and their print heads are used in most machines from a variety of manufacturers. They have their pros and cons and Piezo appears to focus more on the higher resolution side of the industry whereas Seiko and Spectra-Polaris tend more towards the robust, high production capabilities required in a manufacturing environment.

== Print heads ==
At this time these printers use printers using PZT crystals as micro-pumps to eject the droplets from the nozzles. The crystals deform to generate a “shock wave” in the fluid inks which in turn ejects a drop from the nozzle. A combination of surface tension, capillary pressure and other complex fluid dynamics ensures that the fluid is refilled ready for the next fire cycle. There are industrial printers which provide dual print heads.

== See also ==
- Barcode printer
- Label printer
- Multi-function printer
- Wide-format printer
