= Mutoh Europe nv =

Belgian company

- Company type: Business unit
- Industry: Electronics
- Founded: August 1990
- Headquarters: Ostend, West Flanders, Belgium
- Key people: Frank Schenk, Managing Director
- Products: Printers, plotters
- Number of employees: 47 (As of November, 2024)
- Website: Mutoh Europe nv

Mutoh Europe nv is a business unit of Mutoh Holdings Co. Ltd.

== Business Summary ==
- Established August 1990
- Located in Ostend, Belgium
- Core business: digital desktop and Wide-format printer (waterbased UV, UV & MP, Sign & Display, Sublimation), sign cutting Plotters and CAD
- Sales, marketing, distribution, logistics, after-sales support and service
- Europe, Middle-East and Africa

== Mutoh Europe Company Background ==
- 1987 : Mutoh Deutschland GmbH, Düsseldorf, Germany
- 1992 : Local Manufacturing pencil Plotters and scribers at Mutoh Belgium
- 1994 : Introduction cutting plotters
- 1997 : Introduction of Falcon RJ-800 CAD printers
- 1999 : Introduction of Albatros PJ-1304 solvent printers
- 2001 : Factory extension phase 2
- 2002 : Introduction of eco-solvent printers
- 2004 : Factory extension phase 3
- 2005 : Introduction mild solvent printers
- 2006 : i² - Intelligent Interweaving technology
- 2008 : Zephyr UV printer
- 2008 : Acquisition of Sesoma & Sericomex Group
- 2009 : Introduction Kona cutting plotters
- 2010 : Expansion textile / sublimation portfolio
- 2011 : Introduction of a new series of garment pattern marking / cutting plotters, called Kona Apparel
- 2011 : Mutoh Europe announces the layoff of 124 employees; 45 employees will remain.
- 2012 : Extended ValueJet line for Sign & Display, Indoor & Digital Transfer and Direct Textile applications
- 2013 : Introduction ValueCut cutting plotters
- 2013 : Introduction ValueJet 1617H (Mutoh's first Sign & Display printer equipped with white inks)
- 2014 : Introduction ValueJet 1638X & ValueJet 1638WX with DropMaster technology
- 2014 : Introduction ValueJet LED UV printers (ValueJet 426UF & ValueJet 1626UH)
- 2015 : Mutoh & Grafityp obtain Indoor Air Comfort certificate (First pan-European low emission certificate for digitally printed self-adhesive film)
- 2018 : Introduction PerformanceJet flatbed LED UV printer
- 2019 : Introduction XpertJet printers
- 2020 : Introduction VerteLith RIP software
- 2022 : Introduction XpertJet Pro printers
