= Edible ink printing =

Images printed with edible food coloring

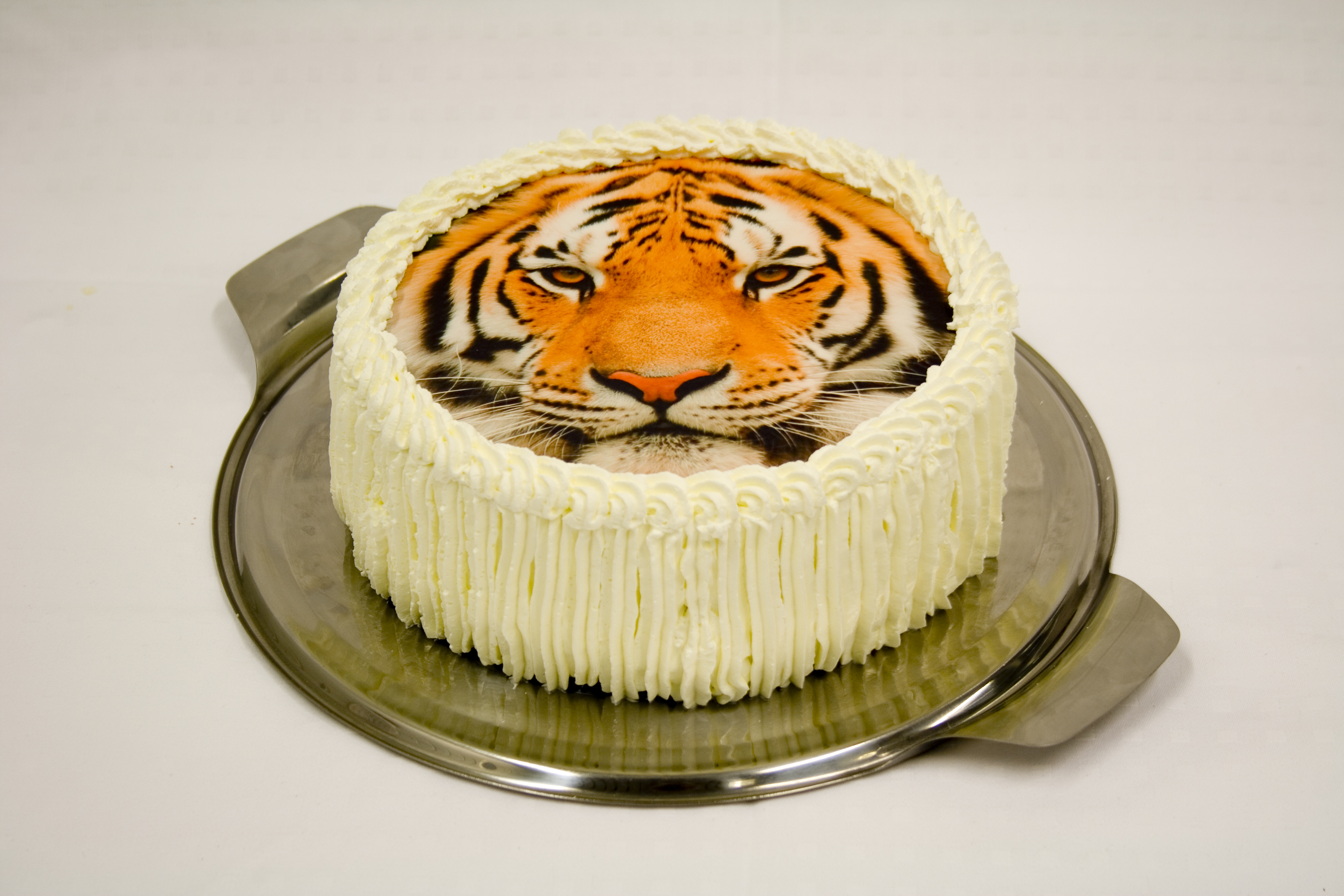
A cake topped with a photograph of a tiger, printed on edible paper

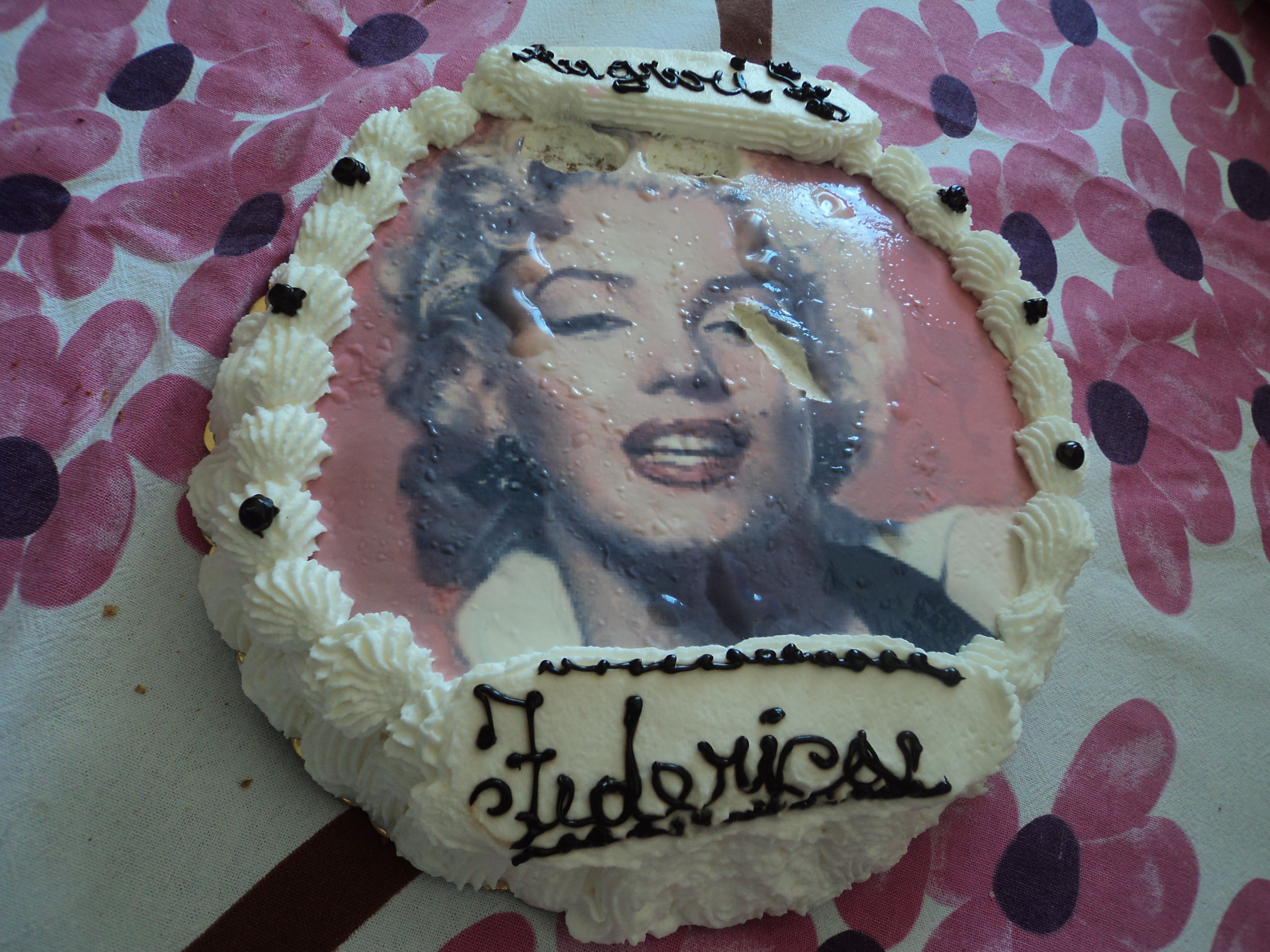
Birthday cake featuring a photograph of Marilyn Monroe

Edible ink printing is the process of creating preprinted images with edible food colors onto various confectionery products such as cookies, cakes and pastries.

== Type of printing ==
There are 2 types of edible ink printing. The first is known as an edible topper. In this method, a design is printed onto an edible sheet — such as sugar paper, frosting sheets, or wafer paper — using edible ink. The printed sheet is then cut and applied onto the surface of cakes, cookies, or other desserts. This is the most traditional and widely used method, especially in custom cake decoration.

The second method is direct-to-food printing (also referred to as food jet printing). Instead of using a separate transfer layer, edible ink is applied directly onto the surface of the food or beverage itself. Common applications include printing on coffee foam, cocktails or any foamy drinks, cookies, macarons, and other firm desserts. This approach eliminates the need for a carrier sheet and allows for more seamless integration of the image onto the food.

For edible topper printing, designs made with edible ink can be either preprinted or created with an edible ink printer, a specialty device which transfers an image onto a thin, edible paper.

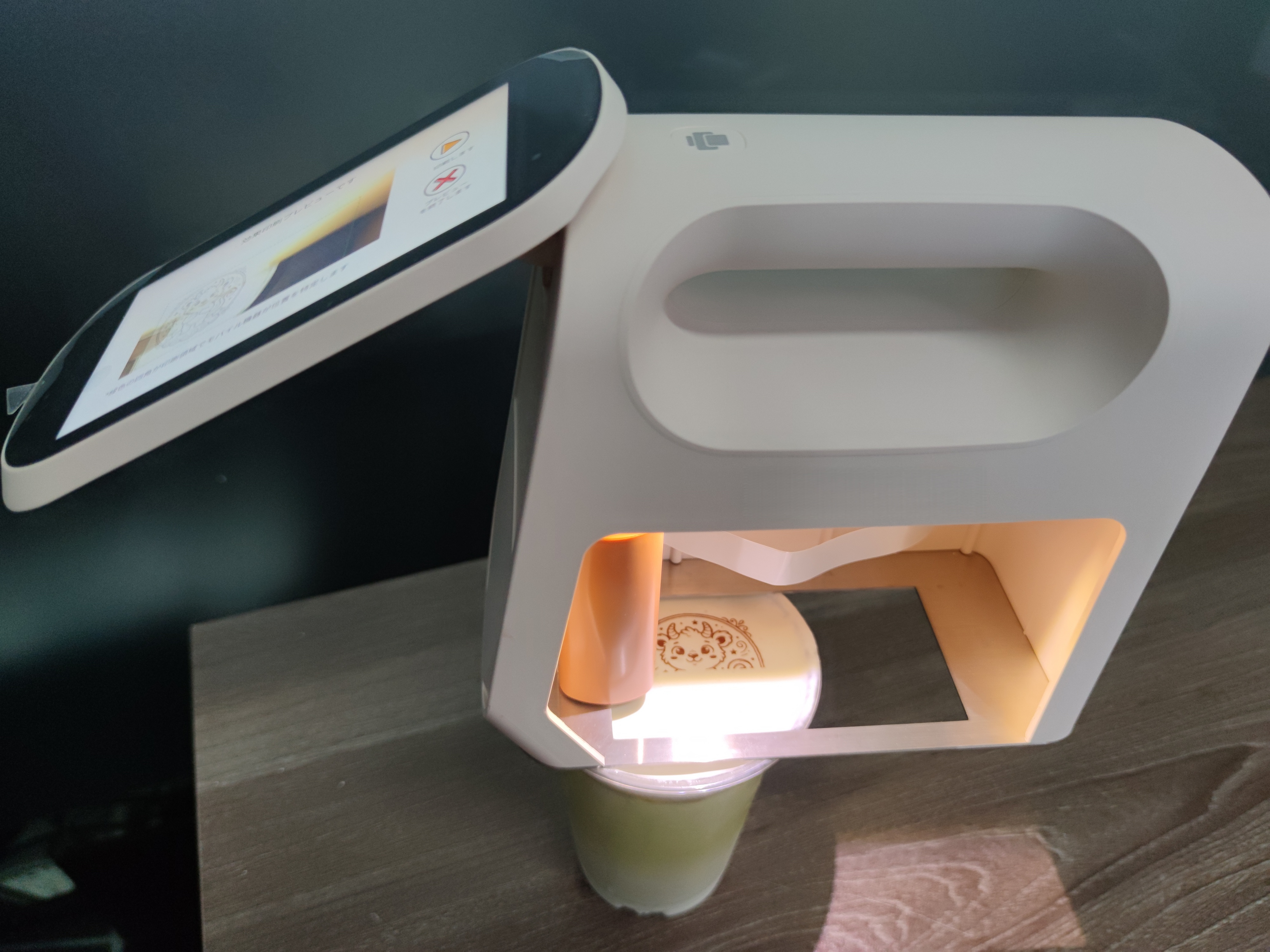
A direct-to-food printer is printing a design onto a cup of milk tea.

== Paper ==
Edible paper is made of starches and sugars and printed with edible food colors. Some edible inks and paper materials have been approved by the Food and Drug Administration and carry its generally recognized as safe certification.

The first papers of this process used rice paper, while modern versions use frosting sheets & wafer paper. The first U.S. patent for food printing, as it applied to edible ink printing, was filed by George J. Krubert of the Keebler Company and granted in 1981. Such paper is eaten without harmful effects. Most edible paper has no significant flavor and limited texture. Edible paper may be printed on by a standard printer and, upon application to a moist surface, dissolves while maintaining a high resolution. The end effect is that the image (usually a photograph) on the paper appears to be printed on the icing.

Because wafer paper burns quickly and easily, it can be printed on with edible ink and used to create a burn-away cake, where the wafer paper is set on fire to reveal a second image printed onto a frosting sheet below.

== Edible inks ==
Edible printer inks have become prevalent and are used in conjunction with special ink printers. Ink that is not specifically marketed as being edible may be harmful or fatal if swallowed. Edible toner for laser printers is not currently available. Any inkjet or bubblejet printer can be used to print, although resolution may be poor, and care should be taken to avoid contaminating the edible inks with previously used inks. Inkjet or bubblejet printers can be converted to print using edible ink, and cartridges of edible ink are commercially available. It is always much safer to use a dedicated inkjet printer for edible ink printing.

Some edible inks are powdered, but if they are easily soluble in water they can also be used as any other edible ink without reducing quality.
