= Ink jet material deposition =

Ink jet material deposition is an emerging manufacturing technique in which inkjet technology is used to deposit materials on substrates. The technique aims to eliminate fixed costs of production and reduce the amount of materials used.

== Uses ==
Anything that is produced using traditional printing techniques is a candidate for ink jet material deposition. In addition, the precision available with ink jet technology may be required for some industrial applications. Examples include:

- Organic light-emitting diode display production.
- Printed circuit boards are typically produced using screen printing, which is not cost-effective for prototyping or small production runs. Conductive ink can be used to create circuit traces.

== Advantages ==
- Since the underlying technology is digital, startup costs of production are relatively low. Each copy produced may be different from the last.
- Expensive materials may be used more efficiently; no material is wasted by placing it where it doesn't need to go.

== Disadvantages ==
- The material to be jetted must be compatible with the print head used and must have its viscosity within a specific range.

== See also ==
- Ink jet printer
