= Edgeline printing =

Edgeline printing is a printing technology based on ink jet printing. In the case of traditional ink jet printers, the tiny matchbox size print head moves back and forth. This has inherent delay and requires two dimensional movement: (a) movement of print head; and (b) movement of paper. These movements are one of the reasons for the time lag in the ink jet printing.

In the case of edgeline printing technology, the print head is wide enough to cover the size of the printing paper supported in the printer. The print head has ink jet nozzles for the full length of the print head. By this arrangement the print head need not move and the paper movement is the only required movement.

The technology was developed by Hewlett-Packard, and was used in the Photosmart Express Station pe1000 retail photo kiosks, Photosmart pm1000 Microlab printer, and CM8060/8050 Color MFP office printers.

== Photo lab printers ==
=== PM1000 Microlab printer ===
The PM1000 Microlab printer prints a 6x4 photo in five passes past a set of three fixed print heads. While the print head is large enough to cover the whole photo the 5 passes prevents pooling by putting down too much ink at once and enables the printer to hide faulty nozzles. This printer can print a photo in 5 seconds.

=== PE1000 Photosmart Express ===
The Photosmart Express Station is basically a PM1000 print engine with a user friendly kiosk mounted on top designed for customers to print photos quickly from memory cards or other sources.

== Office printers ==
=== CM8050 / CM8060 ===
The CM8050 and CM8060 are high volume office printers that can print an entire A4/Letter page in a single pass, or an A3 page in two passes. To achieve this it uses two carriages with three print heads each, each print head containing 10,560 nozzles. This enables the printer to print up to 71 pages per minute in black and color (CM8060) and 57 ppm (CM8050).

== See also ==
- Line matrix printer
