= Supertank printer =

CISS printer

Supertank printers are a type of continuous ink system (CISS) inkjet printer. Supertank printers differ from traditional inkjet printers in that the printhead is connected via a tube system that draws ink from large ink tanks built into the printer, which are filled and refilled via ink bottles, eliminating the need for ink cartridges. Cost-per-page (CPP) is significantly lower than traditional cartridges, as replacement ink bottles contain enough ink to print thousands of pages, and typically cost under $20.

== Advantages ==
- Printing costs are lower with the use of low-cost replacement ink bottles vs. ink cartridges.
- The convenience of printing thousands of pages with fewer interruptions to replenish ink.
- The reduction of waste due to the elimination of used cartridges and their packaging.
- The printer must measure the ink volume remained in the printer optically and cannot use smart chips to block a cartridge.

== Disadvantages ==
- The initial cost to purchase is higher than equivalent cartridge printers, which often follow the razor and blades model of selling the printers at or below cost to generate later sales of proprietary cartridges.
- In supertank printers with fixed printheads (all models from Epson and HP, and some Canon models), printhead replacement can be expensive, if possible at all.

== Examples ==
Epson pioneered this technology by launching the EcoTank range, first in Indonesia in 2010, with a North American launch in 2015. The supertank concept proved commercially successful, and Canon and HP launched their own lines of supertank printers, under the names MegaTank (Canon) and Smart Tank (HP).
