= UV pinning =

UV pinning is the process of applying a dose of low intensity ultraviolet (UV) light to a UV curable ink (UV ink). The light's wavelengths must be correctly matched to the ink's photochemical properties. As a result, the ink droplets move to a higher viscosity state, but stop short of full cure. This is also referred to as the "gelling" of the ink.

UV pinning is typically used in UV ink jet applications (e.g. the printing of labels, the printing of electronics, and the fabrication of 3-D microstructures).

== Purpose ==
UV pinning enhances the management of drop size and image integrity, minimizing the unwanted mixing of drops and providing the highest possible image quality and the sharpest colour rendering.

Challenge: Overcome the wetting problems that were causing UV-Curable inks to spread and cause ink droplets to bleed into each other before full curing single-pass digital printing of narrow web labels.

Solution: A UV pinning system that uses high power UV light emitting diodes (LEDs) installed next to the inkjet array (print head). The UV light from the pinning system, typically lower than that of the full cure UV system, causes the UV ink to thicken, also known as gelling, but not fully cure. This ink thickening stops dot gain and holds the ink droplet pattern in place until it reaches the full cure UV system.
