= Jet damping =

Jet damping or thrust damping is the effect of rocket exhaust removing energy from the transverse angular motion of a rocket. If a rocket has pitch or yaw motion then the exhaust must be accelerated laterally as it flows down the exhaust tube and nozzle. Once the exhaust leaves the nozzle this lateral momentum is lost to the vehicle and thus serves to damp the lateral oscillations. The jet damping is stabilizing as long as the distance from the instantaneous spacecraft center of mass to the nozzle exit plane exceeds the instantaneous transverse radius of gyration. Most rocket or missile configurations meet this criterion and the jet damping has a dynamic stabilizing effect. The jet damping torque rotates at nutation frequency in the spacecraft frame.

The jet damping contributes to the pitch and yaw damping coefficients, $Cm_q$ and $Cn_r$, where $Cm_q$ is the rate of change of pitching moment with respect to pitch rate and $Cn_r$ is the rate of change of the yawing moment with respect to yaw rate. For jet airplanes in cruise, the contribution of jet damping is usually negligible because the external aerodynamic damping is large relative to the jet damping. Rockets at lift-off, however, have practically zero external aerodynamic damping and the jet damping becomes significant.
