= Inkjet transfer =

Inkjet transfer or inkjet photo transfer is a technique to transfer a photograph or graphic, printed with an inkjet printer onto textiles, cups, CDs, glass and other surfaces.

A special transfer sheet, usually ISO A4 size, is printed on with a regular inkjet printer. The photo has to be printed as a mirror image (except for some transfer sheets for dark materials).

== T-shirt transfer ==
It is often a requirement of "homemade" garments (adhesive-based transfers) that they are washed inside out, only in cold water, sometimes by hand, and not be tumble dried. The heat from washing or drying conventionally, or from ironing over the transfer area, can damage the transfer or cause it to separate. These attributes generally make them less practical for frequent wear than purchased items.

The second type of transfer paper is merely a substrate which ink is deposited onto, from which it is sublimated directly into the t-shirt fibers (requires at least 50% polyester fabric). The main advantages of this process are permanence and lack of a rough adhesive on the surface of the fabric. This technique is used commercially, and not easily reproduced at home, since a heat press is required to heat the inks to their sublimation temperature (over 200°F) evenly.

=== Technique ===
The transfer sheet is placed ink side down (usually) onto a t-shirt or fabric and ironed (without steam) onto the cloth. Some transfer sheets change color to signal that the transfer is finished. To create a glossy effect with adhesive-based transfers, the transfer sheet is removed after it has been cooled down. To create a matte effect, it is peeled off while still hot.
