= Water-jet printer =

A water-jet printer (or waterjet printer) is a printer that makes use of paper coated with special dyes and ink cartridges filled with water to print paper copies of documents. Using paper treated with oxazolidine, the water jet changes the colour of the chemical to produce a print which fades in about a day, depending on temperature, and the paper can be re-used rather than being disposed of. The print fades away within about 22 hours at temperatures below 35 degrees Celsius (95 degrees Fahrenheit) as the water evaporates. While the chemical treatment makes the paper slightly more expensive, use of water instead of ink in the printer makes it much cheaper overall, and the only change needed to the printer is to replace what's in the cartridge.

The technology for water-jet printing was developed by a team of Chinese scientists led by Sean Xiao-An Zhang, a chemistry professor at Jilin University in China.

To create rewritable paper the researchers used four oxazolidines. Some of the isomers of these oxazolidines are colourless in the absence of water but when the paper is wetted, the water changes the dyes’ absorption of visible light. The exact wavelengths absorbed vary with the compound used, which allows printing in a variety of colours. The rewriteable paper was made by first coating ordinary paper with a layer of polyethylene glycol (PEG) to prevent it reacting with the dye, before a second layer of PEG containing the chosen dye was laid on top. Finally, another layer of PEG was added to prevent the dye absorbing water from the air or, conversely, losing water too quickly. The team used a commercial inkjet printer and a cartridge filled with water to print trial documents. The printed page is dry to the touch and the print can be rapidly ‘erased’ by heating it to 70 °C. The print remained legible for around 22 hours before evaporation wiped the page clean. Paper prepared in this way can be printed on and then erased more than 50 times.
