= Wide-format printer =

Computer-controlled printing machine

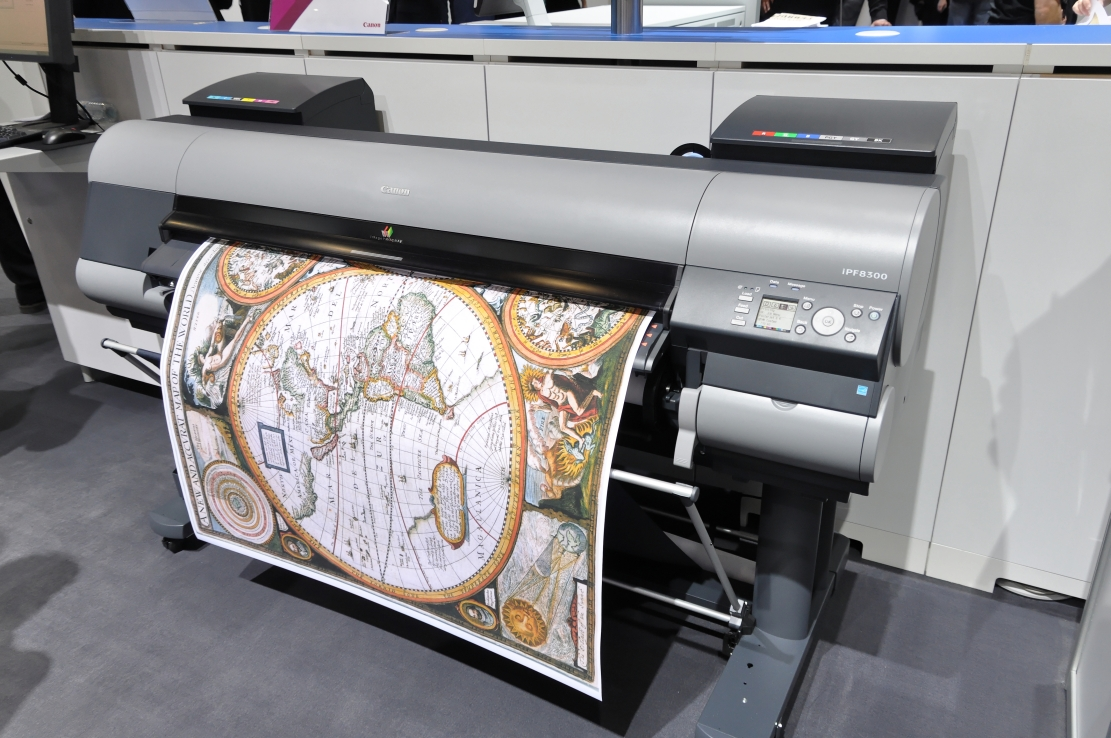
A Canon wide format printer

Wide format printers (large format printers), sometimes colloquially called plotters referring to the device whose purpose was replaced, are generally accepted to be any computer-controlled printing machines (printers) that support a maximum print roll width of between 18 and 100 inches (460 and 2,540 mm). Printers with capacities over 100 inches (2,500 mm) wide are considered super-wide or grand format. Wide-format printers are used to print banners, posters, trade show graphics, wallpaper, murals, backlit film (duratrans), vehicle image wraps, electronic circuit schematics, architectural drawings, construction plans, backdrops for theatrical and media sets, and any other large format artwork or signage. Wide-format printers usually employ some variant of inkjet or toner-based technology to produce the printed image; and are more economical than other print methods such as screen printing for most short-run (low quantity) print projects, depending on print size, run length (quantity of prints per single original), and the type of substrate or print medium.

Wide-format printers are usually designed for printing onto a roll of print media that feeds incrementally during the print process, rather than onto individual sheets.

== Technologies ==
Wide-format printers can be categorized by the type of ink transfer process they employ:

- Aqueous: Thermal or Piezo inkjet printers using an ink known as aqueous or water-based. The term water base is a generally accepted misnomer. The pigment is held in a non-reactive carrier solution that is sometimes water and other times a substitute liquid, including a soy-based liquid used by Kodak. Aqueous ink is generally available in two types, dye and pigment. Dye ink is high color, low UV-resistant variety that offers the widest color gamut. Pigment ink is generally duller in color, requiring more inks to achieve wide inks but withstands fading from UV rays. Similar in general principle to desktop inkjet printers. Finished prints must be laminated to protect them if they are to be used outdoors. Various substrates (media) are available, including canvases, banners, metabolized plastic, and cloth. Aqueous technology requires that all materials be properly coated to accept and hold the ink.
- Solvent: This term is used to describe any ink that is not water-based. Piezo inkjet printers whose inks use petroleum or a petroleum by-product such as an acetone like carrier liquid. "Eco-Solvent" inks usually contain glycol esters or glycol ether esters and are slower drying. The resulting prints are waterproof. May be used to print directly on uncoated vinyl and other media as well as ridged substrates such as Painted/Coated Metal, Foam Board and PVC. The solvents soften the base material and allow the ink pigments to mechanically latch on to the chemically etched surface. Certain ink manufacturers have different bite based on what solvent carriers they use. Which is what makes solvent ink prints more durable than aqueous inks. However, solvent inks give off strong odor or fumes when drying, as the carrier fluid dissipates through applied heat from the printer's platen. There are various levels of solvent ink ranging from "True or Full Solvent" to "Medium/Mild Solvent" all the way down to "Eco-Solvent". The fume and odour levels decrease accordingly, so does the surface etch of the base material. Full to Medium/Mild Solvents require fume extraction to be considered safe in the working environment. Most Eco-Solvents can be used in an office environment with minimal or tolerable odor levels.
- Dye sublimation: Inks are diffused into the special print media to produce continuous-tone prints of photographic quality.
- UV: Piezo inkjet printers whose inks are UV-curable (dry when cured with UV light). The resulting prints are waterproof, embossed & vibrant. Any media material can be used in this technology, polymer made media are best. Ceramics, glass, metals, and woods are also used with printing with this technology.
- Pen/plotter: A pen or pens are used to draw on the print substrate. Mainly used for producing CAD drawings. Generally superseded by digital technologies such as Solvent, Aqueous, and UV.

== See also ==
- Inkjet technology
