= Printer (computing) =

Computer peripheral that prints text or graphics

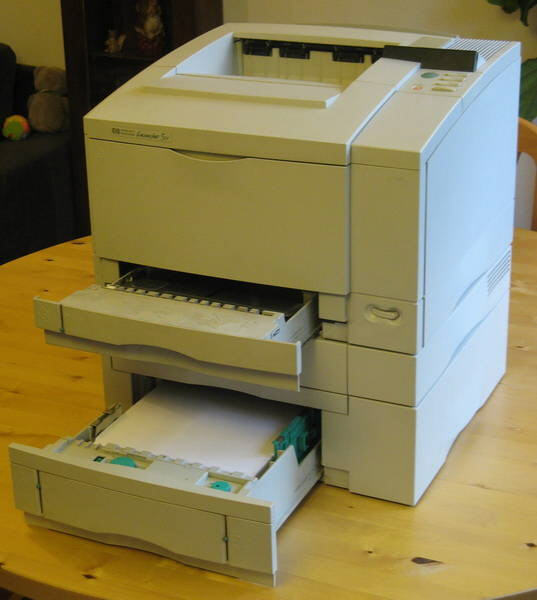
HP LaserJet 5 printer

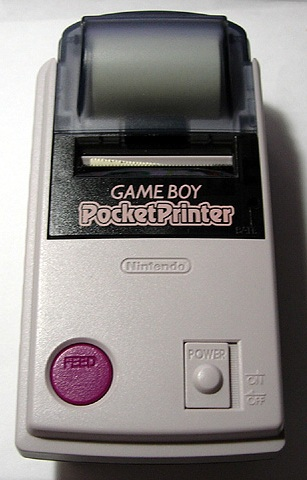
The Game Boy Pocket Printer, a thermal printer released as a peripheral for the Nintendo Game Boy

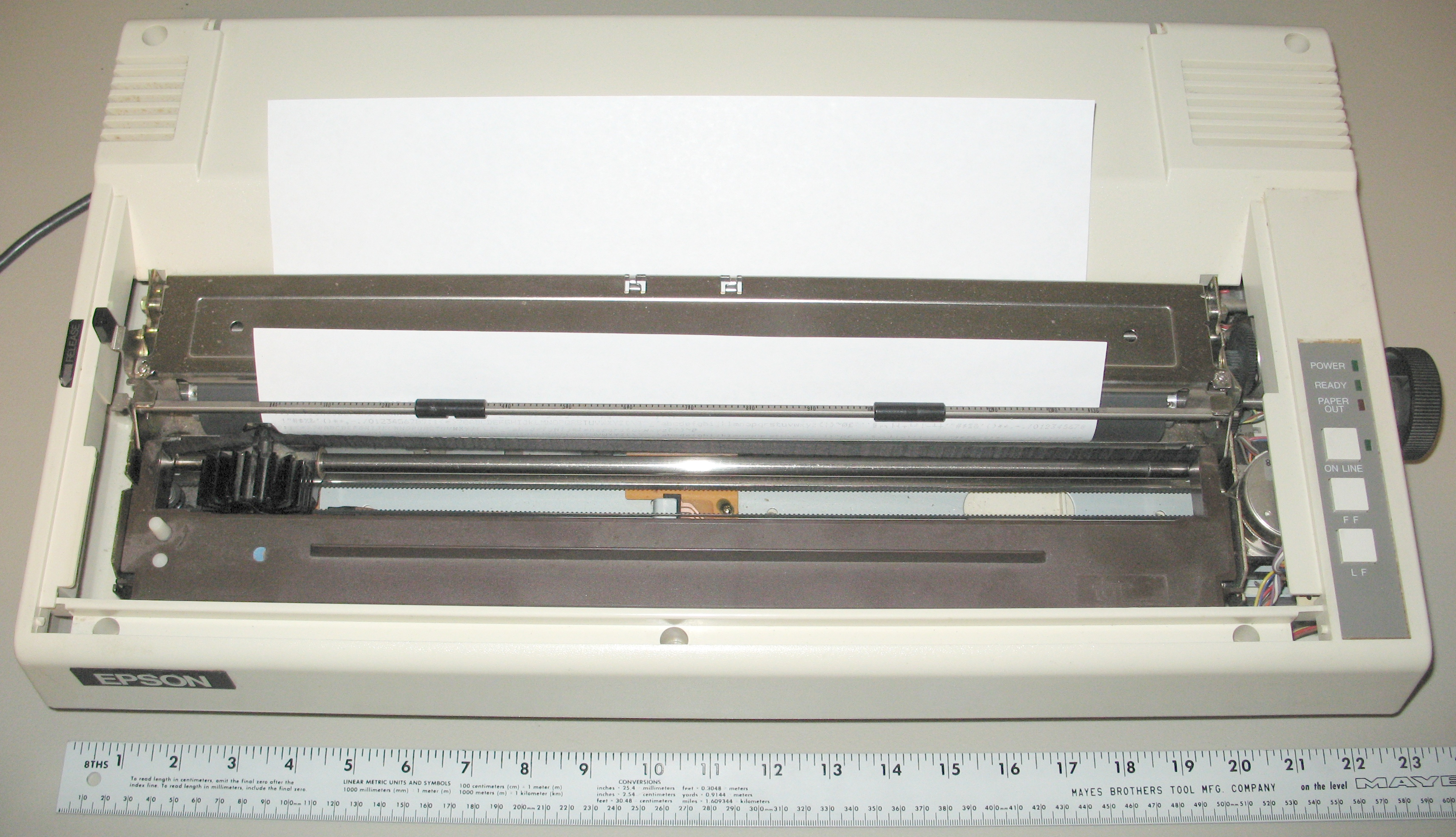
This is an example of a wide-carriage dot matrix printer, designed for 14-inch (360 mm) wide paper, shown with 8.5-by-14-inch (220 mm × 360 mm) legal paper. Wide carriage printers were often used in the field of businesses, to print accounting records on 11-by-14-inch (280 mm × 360 mm) tractor-feed paper. They were also called "132-column printers".

A video showing an inkjet printer while printing a page

A printer is a peripheral machine which makes a durable representation of graphics or text, usually on paper. While most output is human-readable, bar code printers are an example of an expanded use for printers. Different types of printers include 3D printers, inkjet printers, laser printers, and thermal printers.

== History ==
The first computer printer designed was a mechanically driven apparatus by Charles Babbage for his difference engine in the 19th century; however, his mechanical printer design was not built until 2000. He also had plans for a curve plotter, which would have been the first computer graphics printer if it was built.

The first patented printing mechanism for applying a marking medium to a recording medium or more particularly an electrostatic inking apparatus and a method for electrostatically depositing ink on controlled areas of a receiving medium, was in 1962 by C. R. Winston, Teletype Corporation, using continuous inkjet printing.

The ink was a red stamp-pad ink manufactured by Phillips Process Company of Rochester, NY under the name Clear Print. This patent (US3060429) led to the Teletype Inktronic Printer product delivered to customers in late 1966.

The first compact, lightweight digital printer was the EP-101, invented by Japanese company Epson and released in 1968, according to Epson.

The first commercial printers generally used mechanisms from electric typewriters and Teletype machines. The demand for higher speed led to the development of new systems specifically for computer use. In the 1980s there were daisy wheel systems similar to typewriters, line printers that produced similar output but at much higher speed, and dot-matrix systems that could mix text and graphics but produced relatively low-quality output. Users requiring high-quality line art like blueprints used plotters.

The introduction of the low-cost laser printer in 1984, with the first HP LaserJet, and the addition of PostScript in next year's Apple LaserWriter set off a revolution in printing known as desktop publishing. Laser printers using PostScript mixed text and graphics, like dot-matrix printers, but at quality levels formerly available only from commercial typesetting systems. By 1990, most simple printing tasks like fliers and brochures were now created on personal computers and then laser printed; expensive offset printing systems were being dumped as scrap. The HP DeskJet of 1988 offered the same advantages as a laser printer in terms of flexibility, but produced somewhat lower-quality output (depending on the paper) from much less-expensive mechanisms. Inkjet systems, rapidly displaced dot-matrix and daisy-wheel printers from the market. By the 2000s, high-quality printers of this sort had fallen under the $100 price point and became commonplace.

The rapid improvement of internet email through the 1990s and into the 2000s has largely displaced the need for printing as a means of moving documents, and a wide variety of reliable storage systems means that a "physical backup" is of little benefit today.

Starting around 2010, 3D printing became an area of intense interest, allowing the creation of physical objects with the same sort of effort as an early laser printer required to produce a brochure. As of the 2020s, 3D printing has become a widespread hobby due to the abundance of cheap 3D printer kits, with the most common process being fused deposition modeling.

== Types ==
Personal printers
Personal printers are mainly designed to support individual users, and may be connected to only a single computer. These printers are designed for low-volume, short-turnaround print jobs, requiring minimal setup time to produce a hard copy of a given document. They are generally slow devices ranging from 6 to around 25 pages per minute (ppm), and the cost per page is relatively high. However, this is offset by the on-demand convenience. Some printers can print documents stored on memory cards or from digital cameras and scanners.

Networked printers
Networked, workgroup or shared printers are designed for high-volume, high-speed printing. They are usually shared by many users on a network and can print at speeds of 45 to around 100 ppm. The Xerox 9700 could achieve 120 ppm.

Card printers
A card printer or ID-card printer is used for printing plastic cards, including ID cards. These can now be customised with important features such as holographic overlays, HoloKotes, and watermarks. This is either a direct to card printer (the more feasible option) or a retransfer printer.

Virtual printer
A virtual printer is a piece of computer software whose user interface and API resemble that of a printer driver, but which is not connected with a physical computer printer. A virtual printer can be used to create a file which is an image of the data which would be printed, for archival purposes or as input to another program, for example to create a PDF file or to transmit to another system or user.

Barcode printer
A barcode printer is a computer peripheral for printing barcode labels or tags that can be attached to, or printed directly on, physical objects. Barcode printers are commonly used to label cartons before shipment, or to label retail items with UPCs or IANs.

3D printer

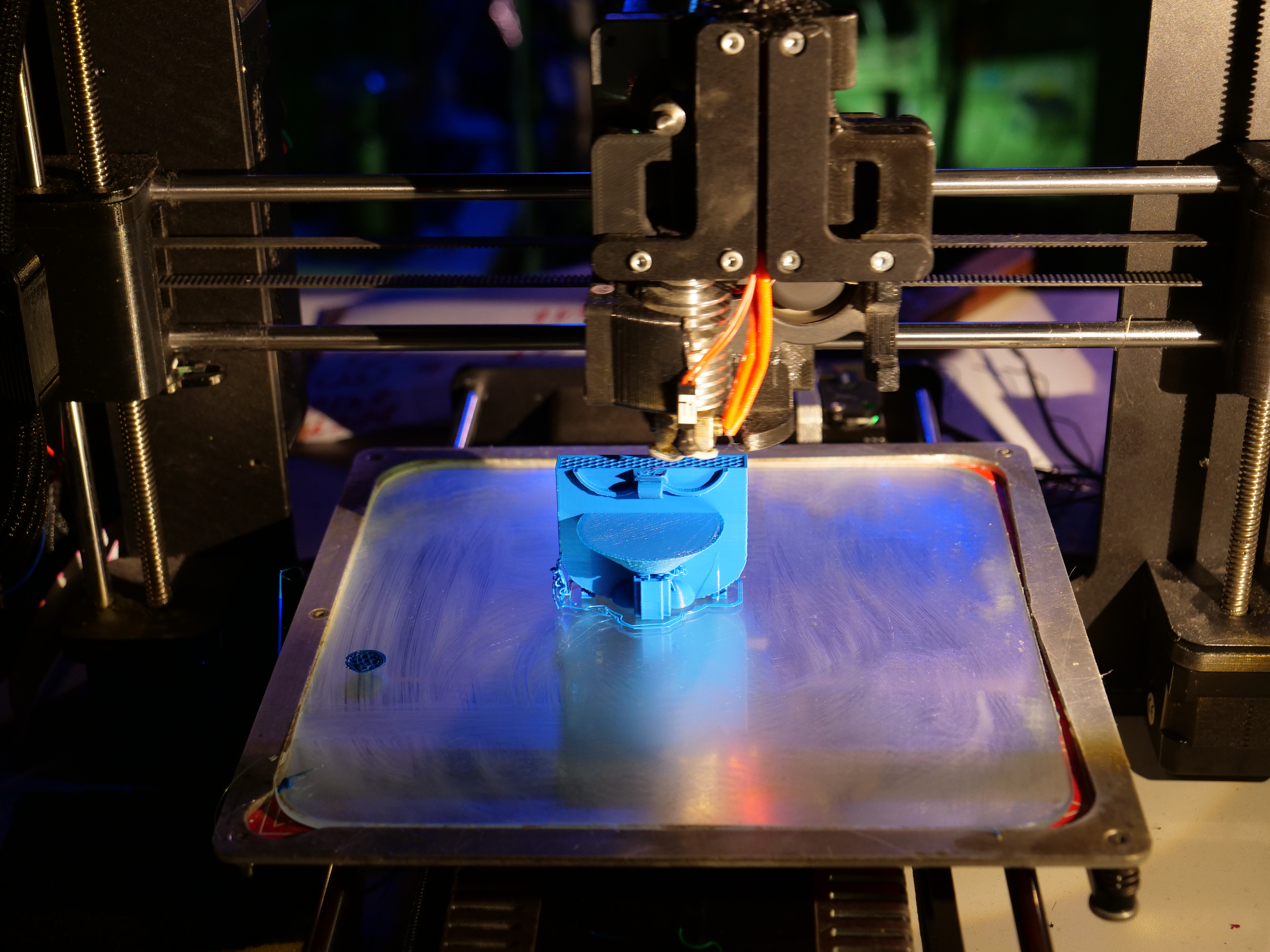
A 3D printer

A 3D printer is a device for making a three-dimensional object from a 3D model or other electronic data source through additive processes in which successive layers of material (including plastics, metals, food, cement, wood, and other materials) are laid down under computer control. It is called a printer by analogy with an inkjet printer which produces a two-dimensional document by a similar process of depositing a layer of ink on paper.

== Technology ==
The choice of print technology has a great effect on the cost of the printer and cost of operation, speed, quality, and permanence of documents, and noise. Some printer technologies do not work with certain types of physical media, such as transparencies or multicopy paper with carbon paper.

A second aspect of printer technology that is often forgotten is resistance to alteration: liquid ink, such as from an inkjet head or fabric ribbon, becomes absorbed by the paper fibers, so documents printed with liquid ink are more difficult to alter than documents printed with toner or solid inks, which do not penetrate below the paper surface.

Cheques can be printed with liquid ink or on special cheque paper with toner anchorage so that alterations may be detected. The machine-readable lower portion of a cheque must be printed using MICR toner or ink. Banks and other clearing houses employ automation equipment that relies on the magnetic flux from these specially printed characters to function properly.

=== Modern print technology ===
The following printing technologies are routinely found in modern printers:

==== Laser printers and other toner-based printers ====
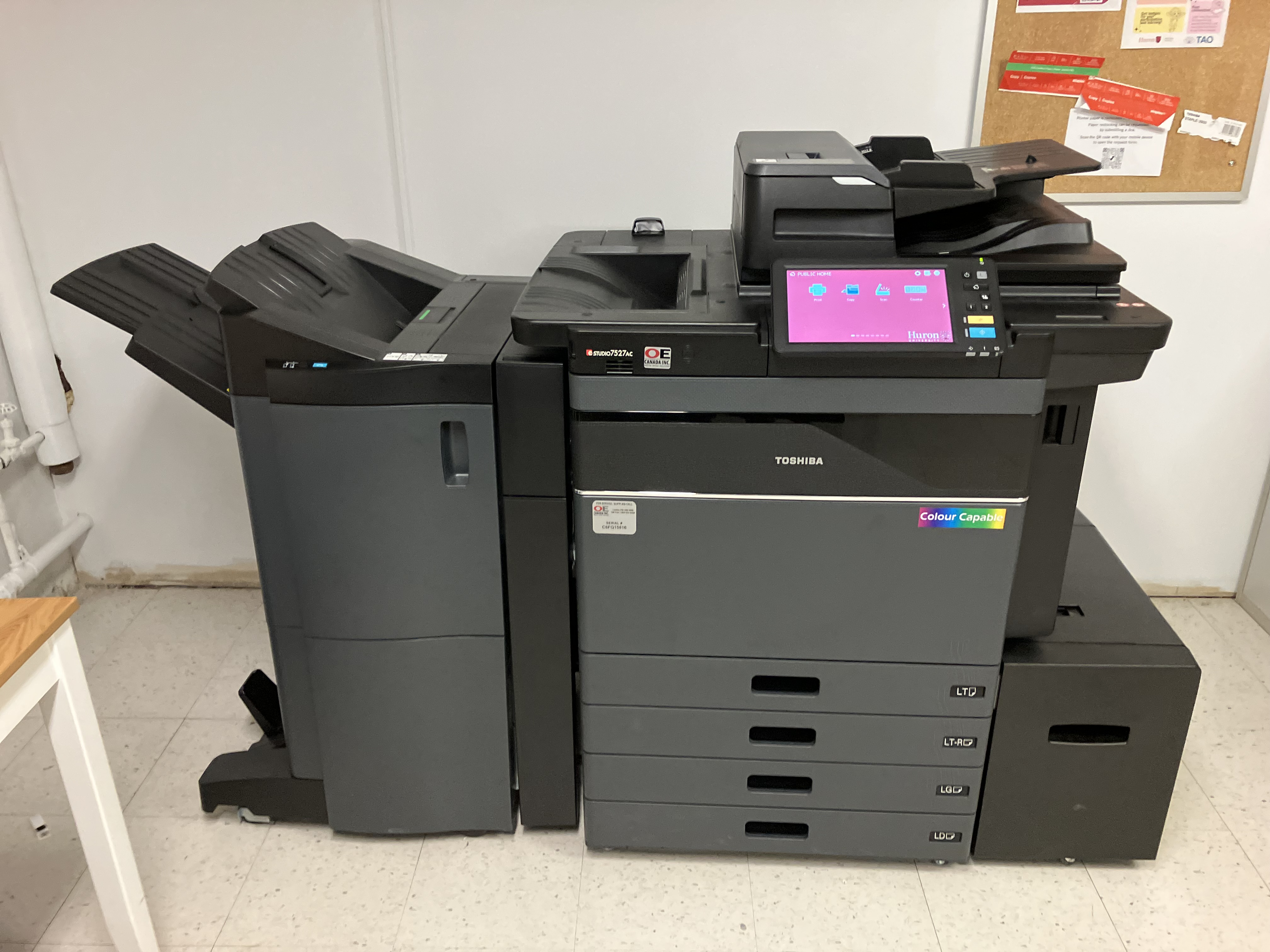
A Toshiba office laser printer

A laser printer rapidly produces high quality text and graphics. As with digital photocopiers and multifunction printers (MFPs), laser printers employ a xerographic printing process but differ from analog photocopiers in that the image is produced by the direct scanning of a laser beam across the printer's photoreceptor.

Another toner-based printer is the LED printer which uses an array of LEDs instead of a laser to cause toner adhesion to the print drum.

==== Liquid inkjet printers ====
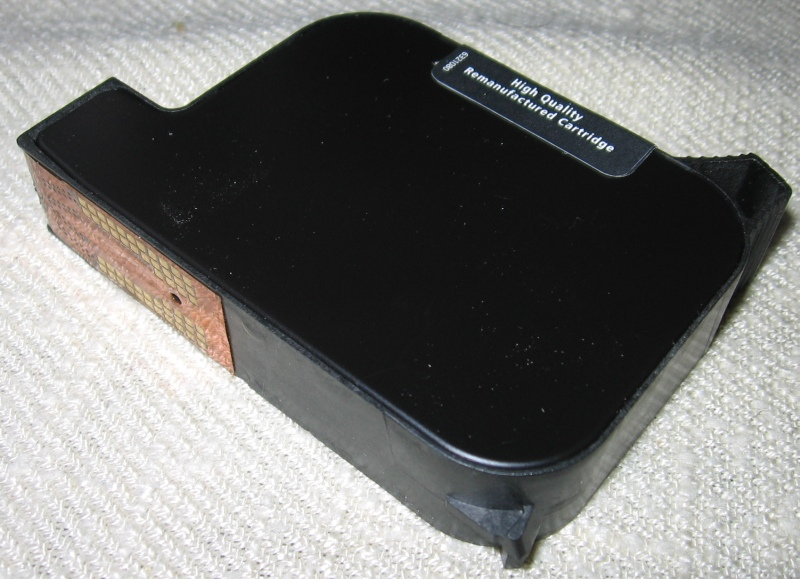
Liquid ink cartridge from Hewlett-Packard HP 845C inkjet printer

HP DeskJet 2630, an inkjet printer

Inkjet printers operate by propelling variably sized droplets of liquid ink onto almost any sized page. They are the most common type of computer printer used by consumers.

==== Solid ink printers ====
Solid ink printers, also known as phase-change ink or hot-melt ink printers, are a type of thermal transfer printer, graphics sheet printer or 3D printer. They use solid sticks, crayons, pearls, or granular ink materials. Common inks are CMYK-colored ink, similar in consistency to candle wax, which are melted and fed into a piezo crystal operated print-head. A Thermal transfer printhead jets the liquid ink on a rotating, oil coated drum. The paper then passes over the print drum, at which time the image is immediately transferred, or transfixed, to the page. Solid ink printers are most commonly used as color office printers and are excellent at printing on transparencies and other non-porous media. Solid ink is also called phase-change or hot-melt ink and was first used by Data Products and Howtek, Inc., in 1984. Solid ink printers can produce excellent results with text and images. Some solid ink printers have evolved to print 3D models, for example, Visual Impact Corporation of Windham, NH was started by retired Howtek employee, Richard Helinski whose 3D patents US4721635 and then US5136515 was licensed to Sanders Prototype, Inc., later named Solidscape, Inc. Acquisition and operating costs are similar to laser printers. Drawbacks of the technology include high energy consumption and long warm-up times from a cold state. Also, some users complain that the resulting prints are difficult to write on, as the wax tends to repel inks from pens, and are difficult to feed through automatic document feeders, but these traits have been significantly reduced in later models. This type of thermal transfer printer is only available from one manufacturer, Xerox, manufactured as part of their Xerox Phaser office printer line. Previously, solid ink printers were manufactured by Tektronix, but Tektronix sold its printer business to Xerox in 2001.

==== Dye-sublimation printers ====
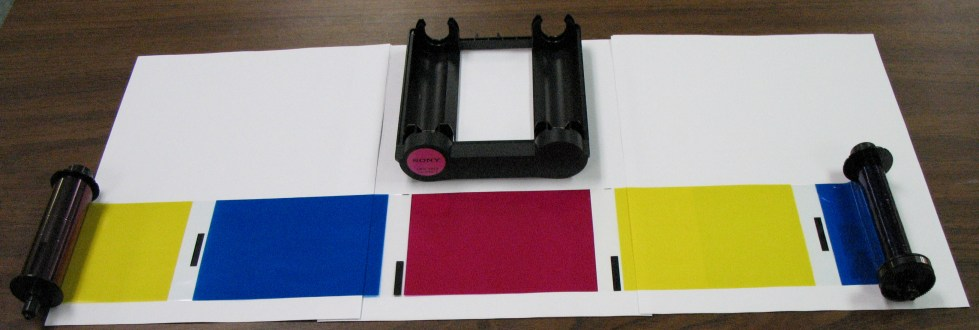
A disassembled dye sublimation cartridge

A dye-sublimation printer (or dye-sub printer) is a printer that employs a printing process that uses heat to transfer dye to a medium such as a plastic card, paper, or canvas. The process is usually to lay one color at a time using a ribbon that has color panels. Dye-sub printers are intended primarily for high-quality color applications, including color photography; and are less well-suited for text. While once the province of high-end print shops, dye-sublimation printers are now increasingly used as dedicated consumer photo printers.

==== Thermal printers ====
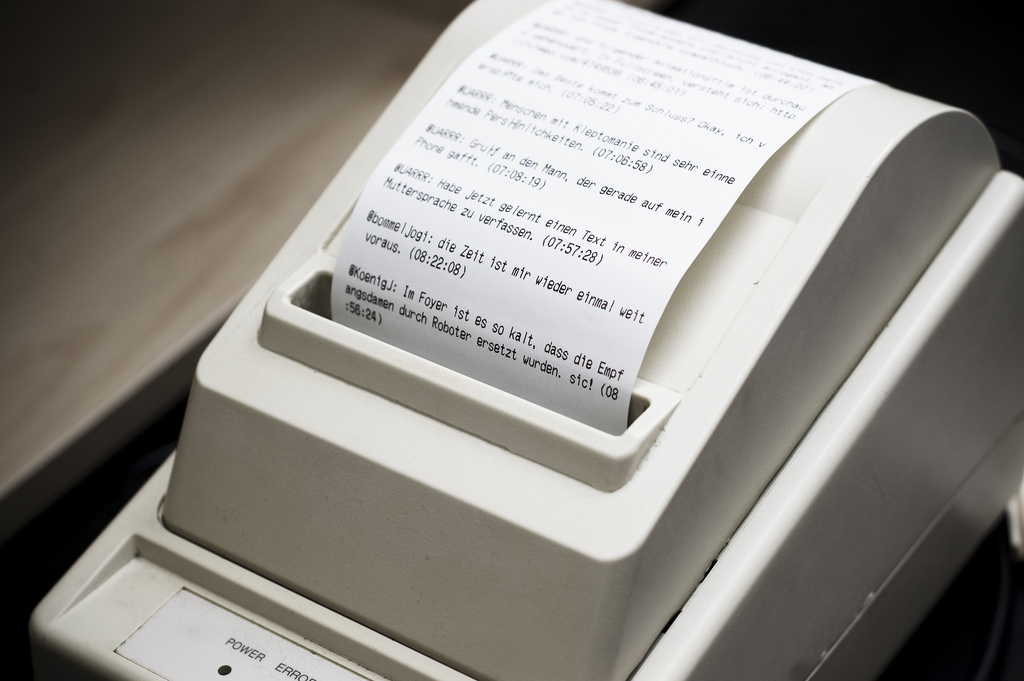
Receipt printer printing an X timeline

Thermal printers work by selectively heating regions of special heat-sensitive paper. Monochrome thermal printers are used in cash registers, ATMs, gasoline dispensers, and some older inexpensive fax machines. Colors can be achieved with special papers and different temperatures and heating rates for different colors; these colored sheets are not required in black-and-white output. One example is Zink (a portmanteau of "zero ink").

=== Obsolete and special-purpose printing technologies ===
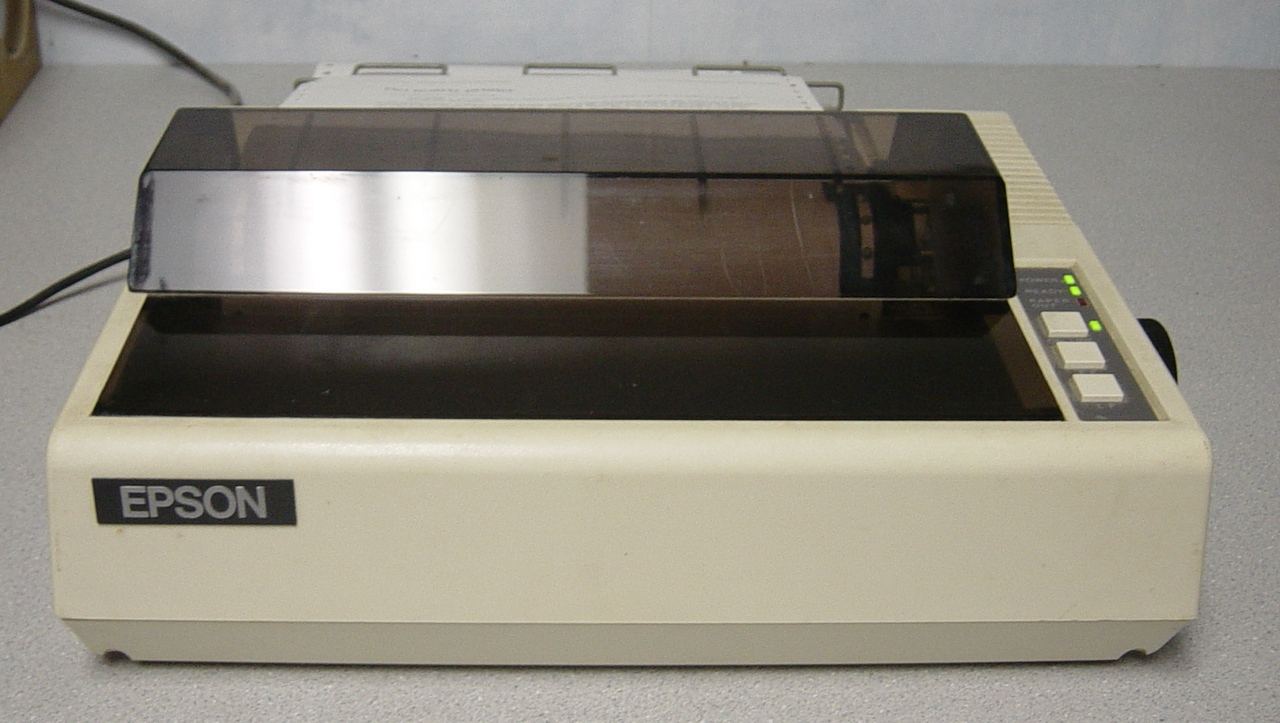
Epson MX-80, a popular model of dot-matrix printer in use for many years

The following technologies are either obsolete, or limited to special applications though most were, at one time, in widespread use.

==== Impact printers ====
all printers sound more or less like an earthquake in hell

— Edward Mendelson, 1985

Impact printers rely on a forcible impact to transfer ink to the media. The impact printer uses a print head that either hits the surface of the ink ribbon, pressing the ink ribbon against the paper (similar to the action of a typewriter), or, less commonly, hits the back of the paper, pressing the paper against the ink ribbon (the IBM 1403 for example). All but the dot matrix printer rely on the use of fully formed characters, letterforms that represent each of the characters that the printer was capable of printing. In addition, most of these printers were limited to monochrome, or sometimes two-color, printing in a single typeface at one time, although bolding and underlining of text could be done by "overstriking", that is, printing two or more impressions either in the same character position or slightly offset. Impact printers varieties include typewriter-derived printers, teletypewriter-derived printers, daisywheel printers, dot matrix printers, and line printers. Dot-matrix printers remain in common use in businesses where multi-part forms are printed. An overview of impact printing contains a detailed description of many of the technologies used.

===== Typewriter-derived printers =====
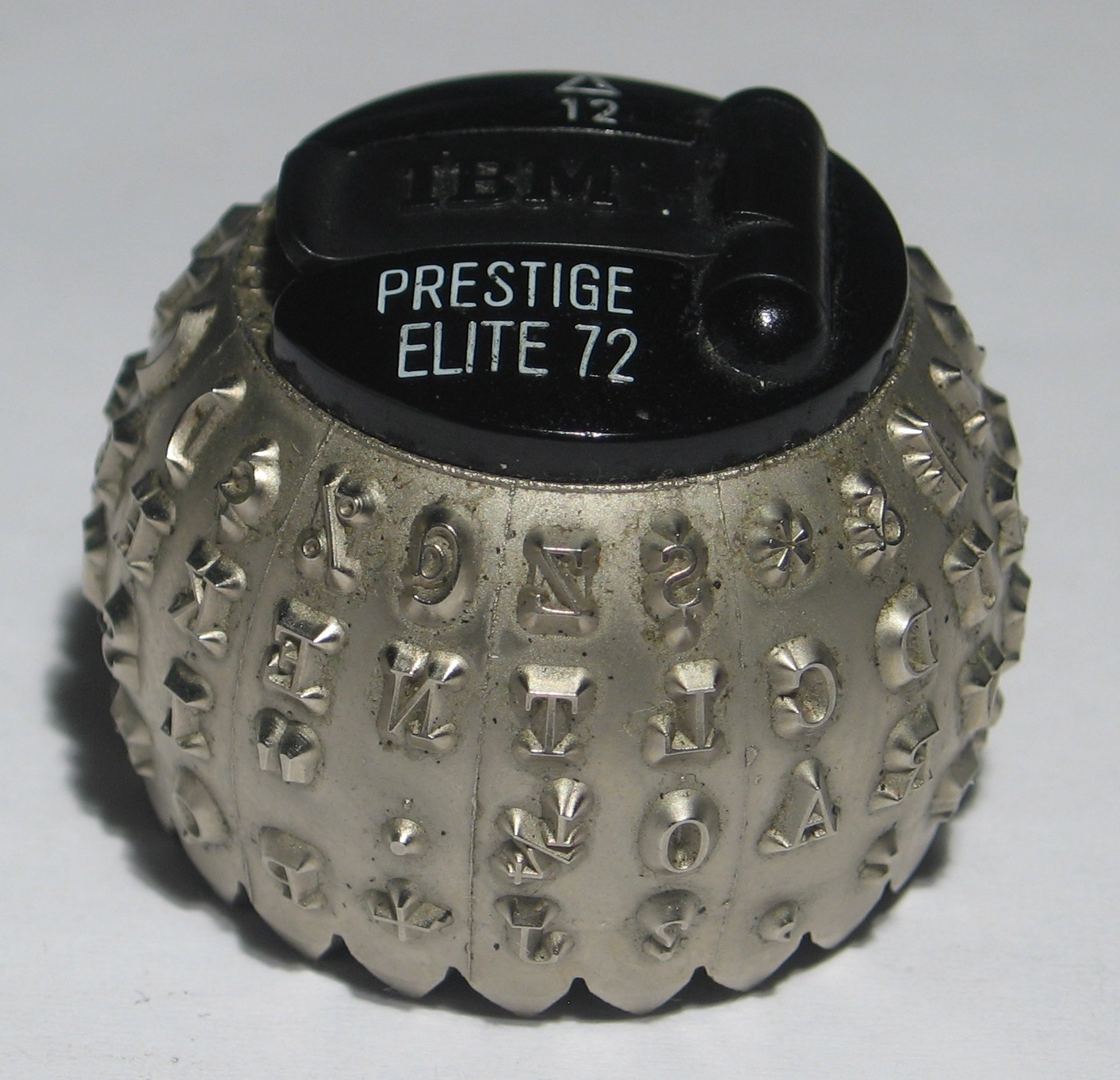
Typeball print element from IBM Selectric-type printer

Several different computer printers were simply computer-controllable versions of existing electric typewriters. The Friden Flexowriter and IBM Selectric-based printers were the most-common examples. The Flexowriter printed with a conventional typebar mechanism while the Selectric used IBM's well-known "golf ball" printing mechanism. In either case, the letter form then struck a ribbon which was pressed against the paper, printing one character at a time. The maximum speed of the Selectric printer (the faster of the two) was 15.5 characters per second.

===== Teletypewriter-derived printers =====
The common teleprinter could easily be interfaced with the computer and became very popular except for those computers manufactured by IBM. Some models used a "typebox" that was positioned, in the X- and Y-axes, by a mechanism, and the selected letter form was struck by a hammer. Others used a type cylinder in a similar way as the Selectric typewriters used their type ball. In either case, the letter form then struck a ribbon to print the letterform. Most teleprinters operated at ten characters per second although a few achieved 15 CPS.

===== Daisy wheel printers =====
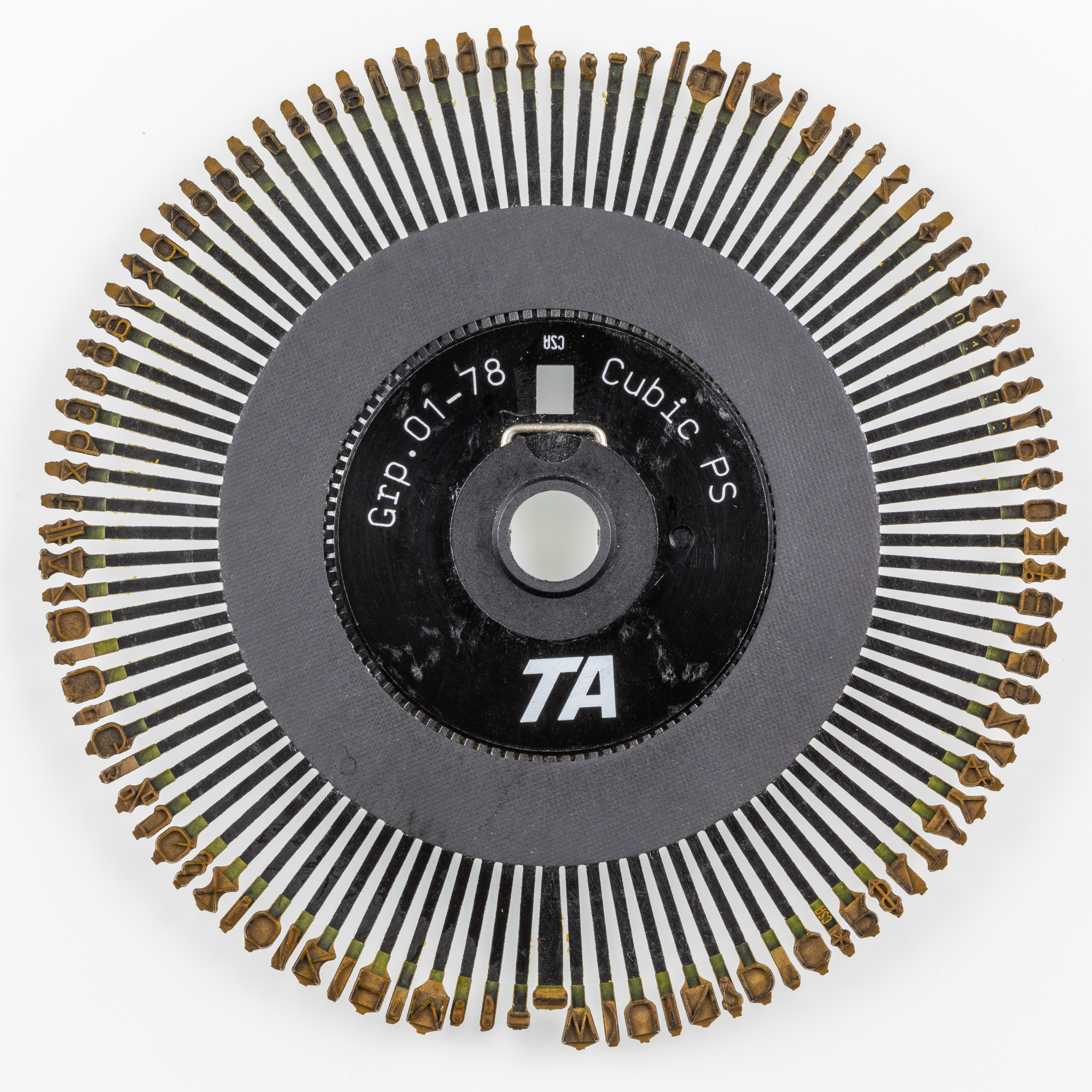
"Daisy wheel" print element

Daisy wheel printers operate in much the same fashion as a typewriter. A hammer strikes a wheel with petals, the "daisy wheel", each petal containing a letter form at its tip. The letter form strikes a ribbon of ink, depositing the ink on the page, and thus printing a character. By rotating the daisy wheel, different characters are selected for printing. These printers were also referred to as letter-quality printers because they could produce text which was as clear and crisp as a typewriter. The fastest letter-quality printers printed at 30 characters per second.

===== Dot-matrix printers =====
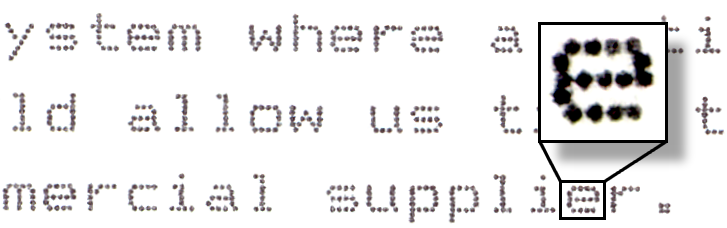
Sample output from 9-pin dot matrix printer (one character expanded to show detail)

The term dot matrix printer is used for impact printers that use a matrix of small pins to transfer ink to the page. The advantage of dot matrix over other impact printers is that they can produce graphical images in addition to text; however the text is generally of poorer quality than impact printers that use letterforms (type).

Dot-matrix printers can be broadly divided into two major classes:

- Ballistic wire printers
- Stored energy printers

Dot matrix printers can either be character-based or line-based (that is, a single horizontal series of pixels across the page), referring to the configuration of the print head.

In the 1970s and '80s, dot matrix printers were one of the more common types of printers used for general use, such as for home and small office use. Such printers normally had either 9 or 24 pins on the print head (early 7 pin printers also existed, which did not print descenders). There was a period during the early home computer era when a range of printers were manufactured under many brands such as the Commodore VIC-1525 using the Seikosha Uni-Hammer system. This used a single solenoid with an oblique striker that would be actuated 7 times for each column of 7 vertical pixels while the head was moving at a constant speed. The angle of the striker would align the dots vertically even though the head had moved one dot spacing in the time. The vertical dot position was controlled by a synchronized longitudinally ribbed platen behind the paper that rotated rapidly with a rib moving vertically seven dot spacings in the time it took to print one pixel column. 24-pin print heads printed at a higher quality and started to offer additional type styles and were marketed as Near Letter Quality by some vendors. Once the price of inkjet printers dropped to the point where they were competitive with dot matrix printers, dot matrix printers began to fall out of favour for general use.

Some dot matrix printers, such as the NEC P6300, can be upgraded to print in color. This is achieved through the use of a four-color ribbon mounted on a mechanism (provided in an upgrade kit that replaces the standard black ribbon mechanism after installation) that raises and lowers the ribbons as needed. Color graphics are generally printed in four passes at standard resolution, thus slowing down printing considerably. As a result, color graphics can take up to four times longer to print than standard monochrome graphics, or up to 8–16 times as long at high resolution mode.

Dot matrix printers are still commonly used in low-cost, low-quality applications such as cash registers, or in demanding, very high volume applications like invoice printing. Impact printing, unlike laser printing, allows the pressure of the print head to be applied to a stack of two or more forms to print multi-part documents such as sales invoices and credit card receipts using continuous stationery with carbonless copy paper. It also has security advantages as ink impressed into a paper matrix by force is harder to erase invisibly. Dot-matrix printers were being superseded even as receipt printers after the end of the twentieth century.

===== Line printers =====
Line printers print an entire line of text at a time. Four principal designs exist.

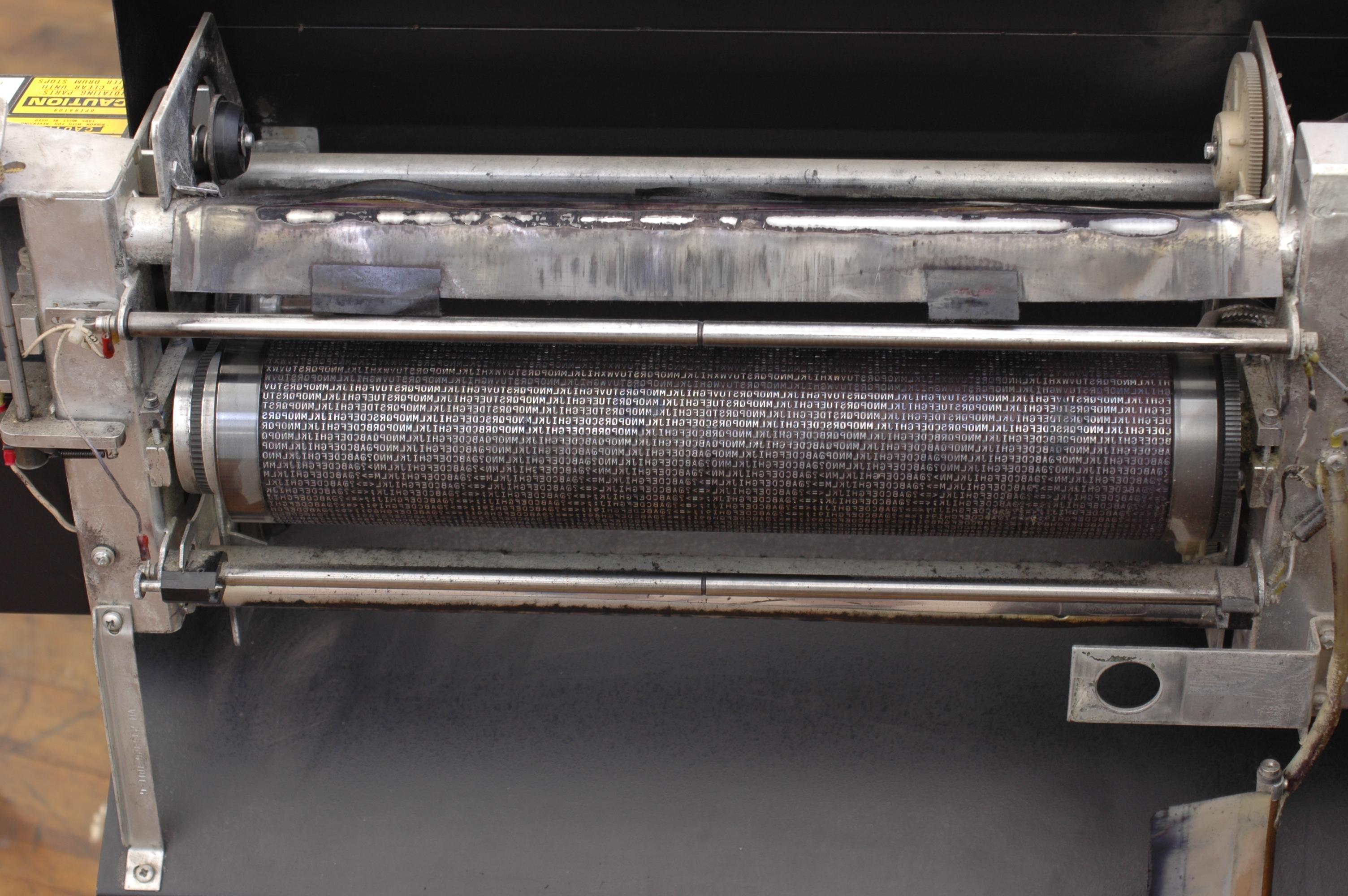
Print drum from drum printer

- Drum printers, where a horizontally mounted rotating drum carries the entire character set of the printer repeated in each printable character position. The IBM 1132 printer is an example of a drum printer. Drum printers are also found in adding machines and other numeric printers (POS), the dimensions are compact as only a dozen characters need to be supported.

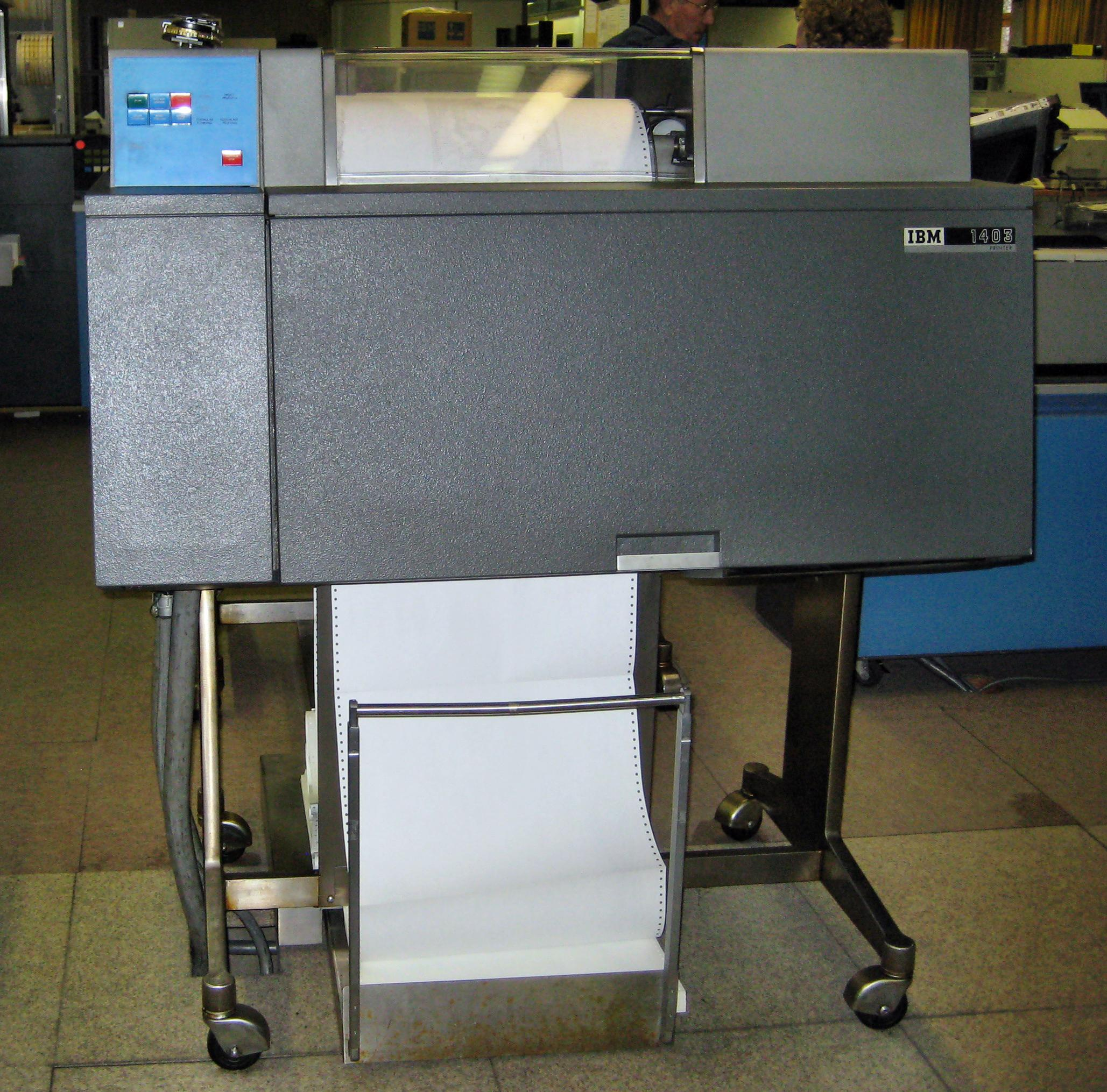
IBM 1403 line printer

- Chain or train printers, where the character set is arranged multiple times around a linked chain or a set of character slugs in a track traveling horizontally past the print line. The IBM 1403 is perhaps the most popular and comes in both chain and train varieties. The band printer is a later variant where the characters are embossed on a flexible steel band. The LP27 from Digital Equipment Corporation is a band printer.
- Bar printers, where the character set is attached to a solid bar that moves horizontally along the print line, such as the IBM 1443.
- A fourth design, used mainly on very early printers such as the IBM 402, features independent type bars, one for each printable position. Each bar contains the character set to be printed. The bars move vertically to position the character to be printed in front of the print hammer.

In each case, to print a line, precisely timed hammers strike against the back of the paper at the exact moment that the correct character to be printed is passing in front of the paper. The paper presses forward against a ribbon which then presses against the character form and the impression of the character form is printed onto the paper. Each system could have slight timing issues, which could cause minor misalignment of the resulting printed characters. For drum or typebar printers, this appeared as vertical misalignment, with characters being printed slightly above or below the rest of the line. In chain or bar printers, the misalignment was horizontal, with printed characters being crowded closer together or farther apart. This was much less noticeable to human vision than vertical misalignment, where characters seemed to bounce up and down in the line, so they were considered as higher quality print.

- Comb printers, also called line matrix printers, represent the fifth major design. These printers are a hybrid of dot matrix printing and line printing. In these printers, a comb of hammers prints a portion of a row of pixels at one time, such as every eighth pixel. By shifting the comb back and forth slightly, the entire pixel row can be printed, continuing the example, in just eight cycles. The paper then advances, and the next pixel row is printed. Because far less motion is involved than in a conventional dot matrix printer, these printers are very fast compared to dot matrix printers and are competitive in speed with formed-character line printers while also being able to print dot matrix graphics. The Printronix P7000 series of line matrix printers are still manufactured as of 2013.

Line printers are the fastest of all impact printers and are used for bulk printing in large computer centres. A line printer can print at 1100 lines per minute or faster, frequently printing pages more rapidly than many current laser printers. On the other hand, the mechanical components of line printers operate with tight tolerances and require regular preventive maintenance (PM) to produce a top quality print. They are virtually never used with personal computers and have now been replaced by high-speed laser printers. The legacy of line printers lives on in many operating systems, which use the abbreviations "lp", "lpr", or "LPT" to refer to printers.

==== Liquid ink electrostatic printers ====
Liquid ink electrostatic printers use a chemical coated paper, which is charged by the print head according to the image of the document. The paper is passed near a pool of liquid ink with the opposite charge. The charged areas of the paper attract the ink and thus form the image. This process was developed from the process of electrostatic copying. Color reproduction is very accurate, and because there is no heating the scale distortion is less than ±0.1%. (All laser printers have an accuracy of ±1%.)

Worldwide, most survey offices used this printer before color inkjet plotters become popular. Liquid ink electrostatic printers were mostly available in 36 to 54 inches (910 to 1,370 mm) width and also 6 color printing. These were also used to print large billboards. It was first introduced by Versatec, which was later bought by Xerox. 3M also used to make these printers.

==== Plotters ====
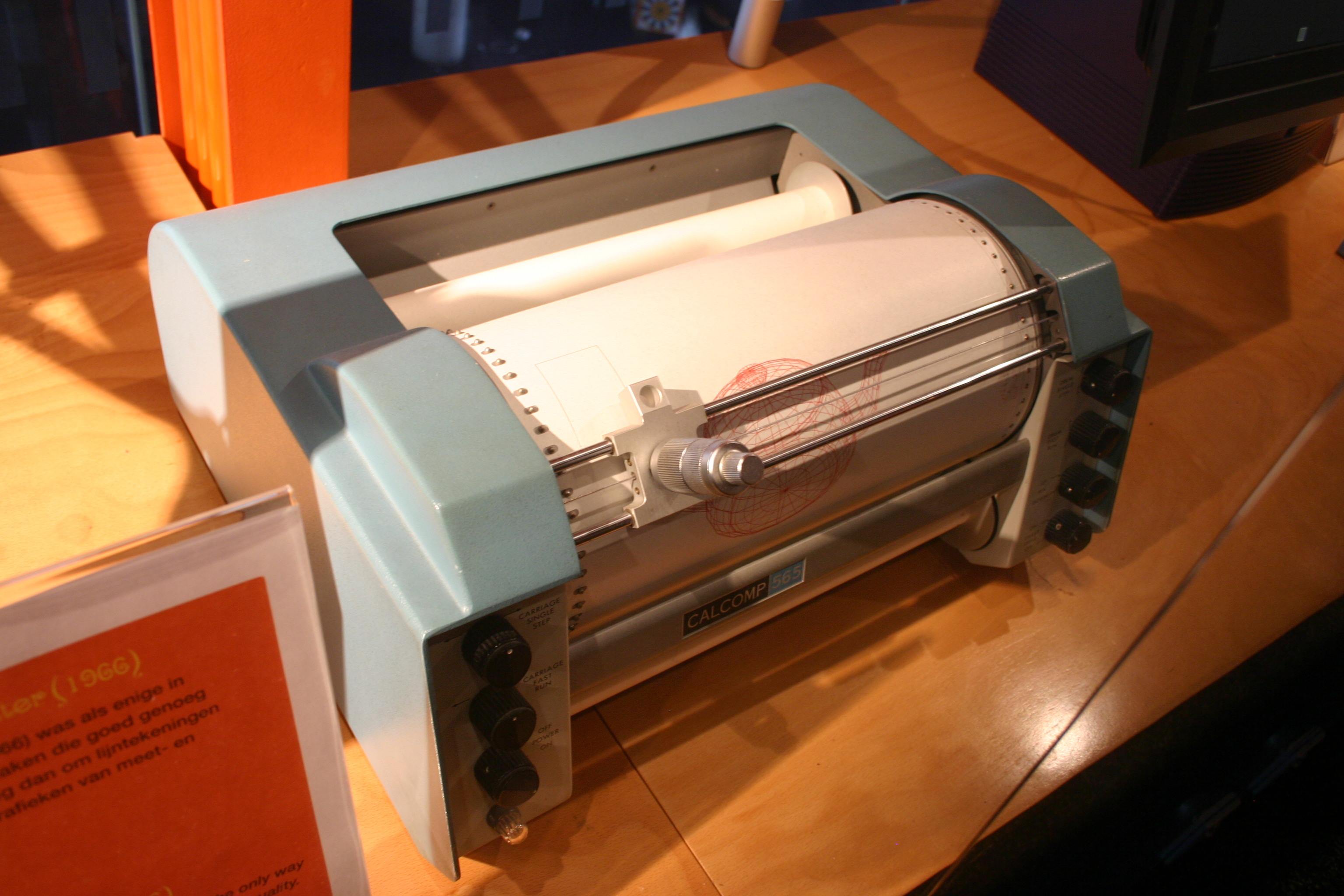
A Calcomp 565 drum plotter

Pen-based plotters were an alternate printing technology once common in engineering and architectural firms. Pen-based plotters rely on contact with the paper (but not impact, per se) and special purpose pens that are mechanically run over the paper to create text and images. Since the pens output continuous lines, they were able to produce technical drawings of higher resolution than was achievable with dot-matrix technology. Some plotters used roll-fed paper, and therefore had a minimal restriction on the size of the output in one dimension. These plotters were capable of producing quite sizable drawings.

=== Other printers ===
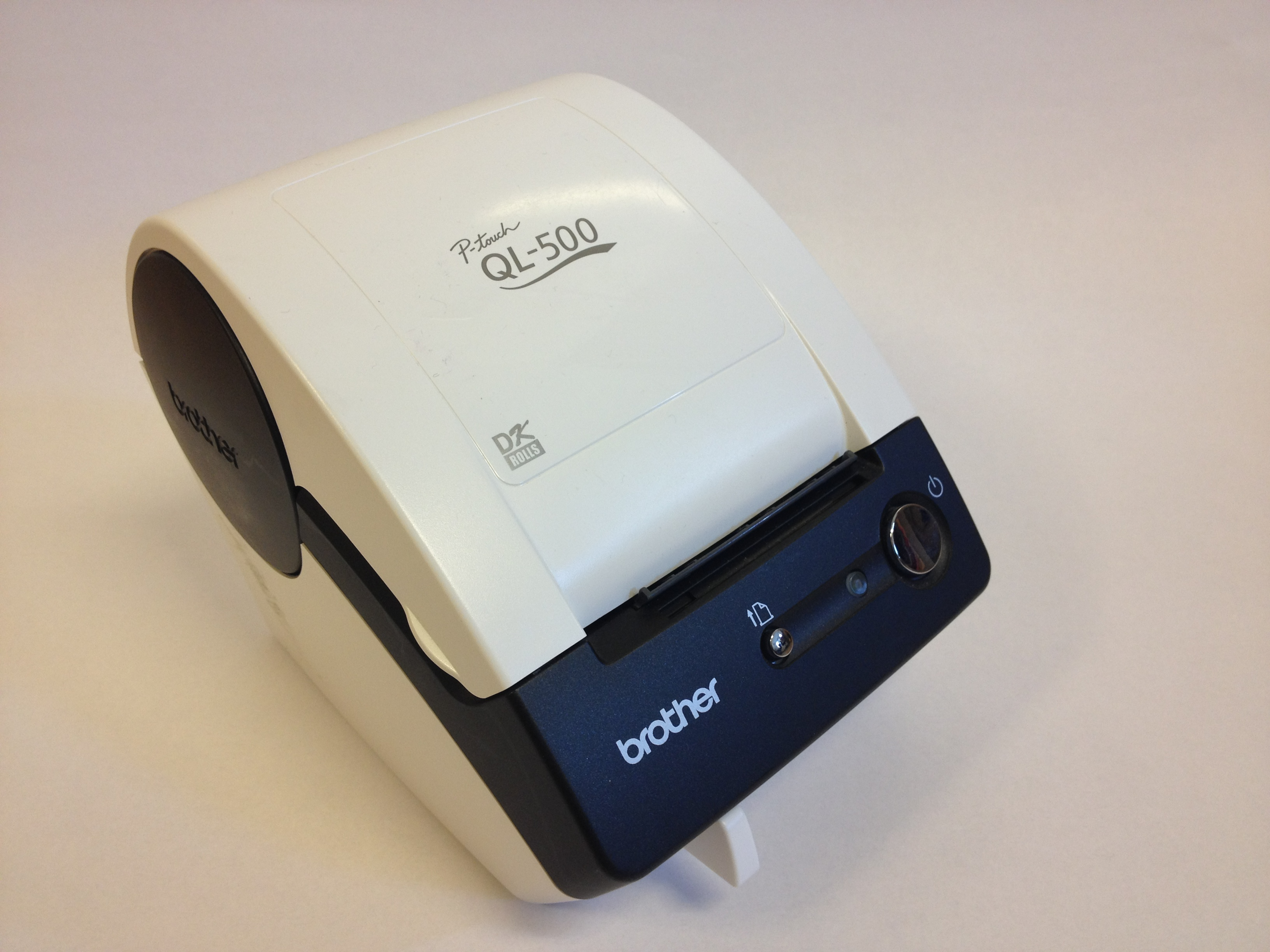
Brother QL-500 label printer

A number of other sorts of printers are important for historical reasons, or for special purpose uses.

- Digital minilab (photographic paper)
- Electrolytic printers
- Spark printer
- Barcode printer multiple technologies, including: thermal printing, inkjet printing, and laser printing barcodes
- Label printer
- Wide-format printer
- Billboard / sign paint spray printers
- Laser etching (product packaging) industrial printers
- Microsphere (special paper)

== Attributes ==
A printer, which takes a digital artifact and converts it into a physical asset, acts as operational technology in a modern information technology environment.

=== Connectivity ===
Printers can be connected to computers in many ways: directly by a dedicated data cable such as the USB, through a short-range radio like Bluetooth, a local area network using cables (such as the Ethernet) or radio (such as WiFi), or on a standalone basis without a computer, using a memory card or other portable data storage device.

=== Printer control languages ===
Most printers other than line printers accept control characters or unique character sequences to control various printer functions. These may range from shifting from lower to upper case or from black to red ribbon on typewriter printers to switching fonts and changing character sizes and colors on raster printers. Early printer controls were not standardized, with each manufacturer's equipment having its own set. The IBM Personal Printer Data Stream (PPDS) became a commonly used command set for dot-matrix printers.

Today, most printers accept one or more page description languages (PDLs). Laser printers with greater processing power frequently offer support for variants of Hewlett-Packard's Printer Command Language (PCL), PostScript or Open XML Paper Specification. Most inkjet devices support manufacturer proprietary PDLs such as ESC/P. The diversity in mobile platforms have led to various standardization efforts around device PDLs such as the Printer Working Group PWG Raster.

=== Printing speed ===
The speed of early printers was measured in units of characters per minute (cpm) for character printers, or lines per minute (lpm) for line printers. Modern printers are measured in pages per minute (ppm). These measures are used primarily as a marketing tool, and are not as well standardised as toner yields. Usually pages per minute refers to sparse monochrome office documents, rather than dense pictures which usually print much more slowly, especially color images. Speeds in ppm usually apply to A4 paper in most countries in the world, and letter paper size, about 6% shorter, in North America.

=== Printing mode ===
The data received by a printer may be:

- a string of characters
- a bitmapped image
- a vector image
- A computer program written in a page description language, such as PCL or PostScript

Some printers can process all four types of data, others not.

- Character printers, such as daisy wheel printers, can handle only plain text data or rather simple point plots.
- Pen plotters typically process vector images. Inkjet-based plotters can adequately reproduce all four.
- Modern printing technology, such as laser printers and inkjet printers, can adequately reproduce all four. This is especially true of printers equipped with support for PCL or PostScript, which includes the vast majority of printers produced today.

Today it is possible to print everything (even plain text) by sending ready bitmapped images to the printer. This allows better control over formatting, especially among machines from different vendors. Many printer drivers do not use the text mode at all, even if the printer is capable of it.

=== Monochrome, color, and photo printers ===
A monochrome printer can only produce monochrome images, with only shades of a single color. Most printers can produce only two colors, black (ink) and white (no ink). With halftone techniques, however, such a printer can produce acceptable grayscale images too

A color printer can produce images of multiple colors. A photo printer is a color printer that can produce images that mimic the gamut (color range) and resolution of prints made from photographic film.

=== Page yield ===
The page yield is the number of pages that can be printed from a toner cartridge or ink cartridge—before the cartridge needs to be refilled or replaced. The actual number of pages yielded by a specific cartridge depends on a number of factors.

For a fair comparison, many laser printer manufacturers use the ISO/IEC 19752 process to measure the toner cartridge yield.

=== Economics ===
In order to fairly compare operating expenses of printers with a relatively small ink cartridge to printers with a larger, more expensive toner cartridge that typically holds more toner and so prints more pages before the cartridge needs to be replaced, many people prefer to estimate operating expenses in terms of cost per page (CPP).

Retailers often apply the "razor and blades" model: a company may sell a printer at cost and make profits on the ink cartridge, paper, or some other replacement part. This has caused legal disputes regarding the right of companies other than the printer manufacturer to sell compatible ink cartridges. To protect their business model, several manufacturers invest heavily in developing new cartridge technology and patenting it.

Other manufacturers, in reaction to the challenges from using this business model, choose to make more money on printers and less on ink, promoting the latter through their advertising campaigns. Finally, this generates two clearly different proposals: "cheap printer – expensive ink" or "expensive printer – cheap ink". Ultimately, the consumer decision depends on their reference interest rate or their time preference. From an economics viewpoint, there is a clear trade-off between cost per copy and cost of the printer.

=== Printer tracking dots ===
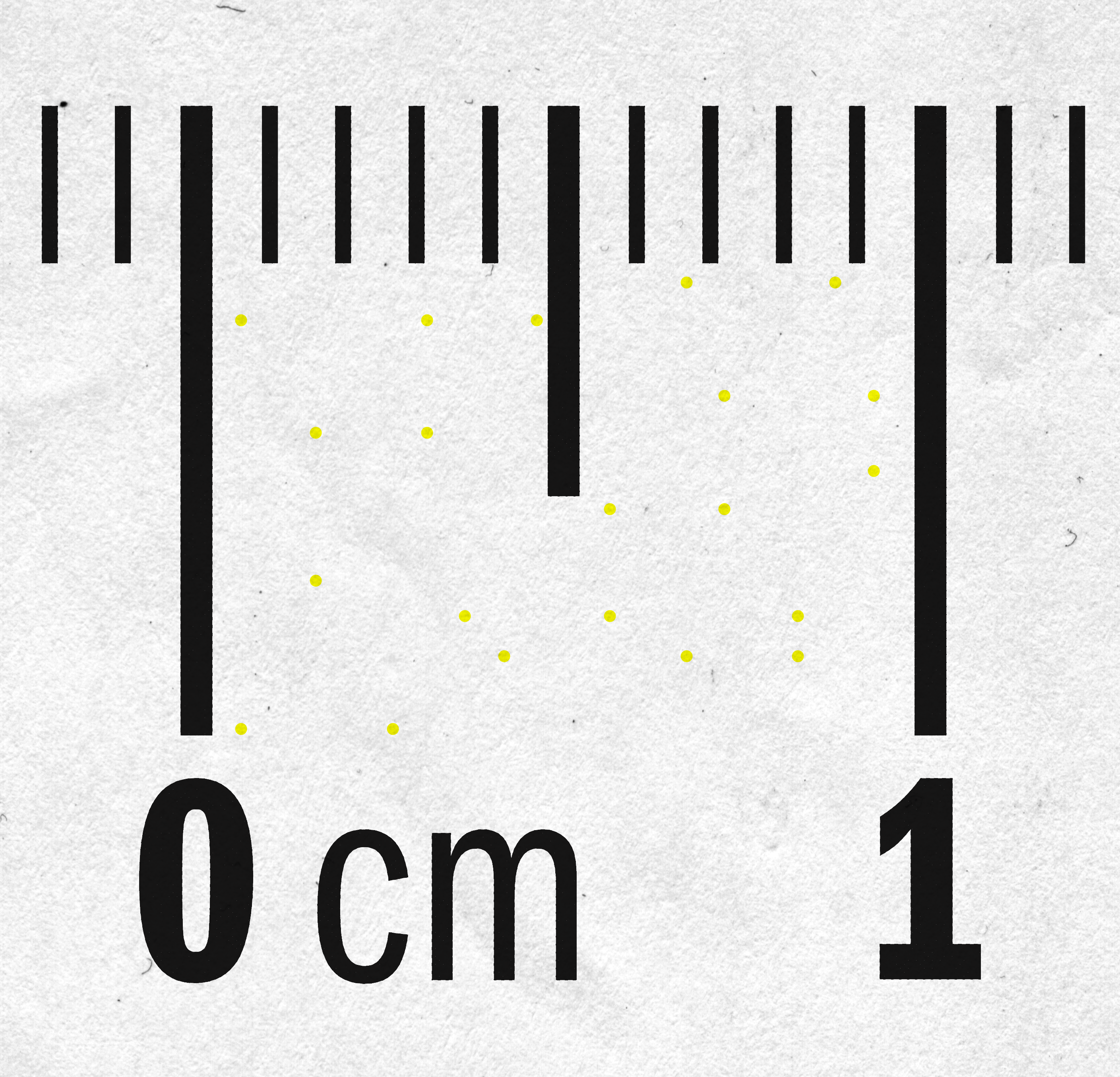
An illustration showing small yellow tracking dots on white paper, generated by a color laser printer

Printer tracking dots are a type of steganography – "hiding data within data" – produced by color printers, including Brother, Canon, Dell, Epson, HP, IBM, Konica Minolta, Kyocera, Lanier, Lexmark, Ricoh, Toshiba, and Xerox brand color laser printers, where tiny yellow dots are added to each page. The dots are barely visible and contain the encoded printer serial number and date and time stamps.

== Manufacturers and market share ==
As of 2020–2021, the largest worldwide vendor of printers is Hewlett-Packard, followed by Canon, Brother, Seiko Epson, and Kyocera. Other known vendors include NEC, Ricoh, Xerox, Lexmark, OKI, Sharp, Konica Minolta, Samsung, Kodak, Dell, Toshiba, Star Micronics, Citizen, and Panasonic.

== See also ==
- Dye-sublimation printing
- History of printing
- Ink ribbon
- Label printer
- List of printer companies
- PRINT (command)
- Print Screen button
- Print server
- Printer (publishing)
- Printer driver
- Printer-friendly (also known as a printable version)
- Printer point
- Printmaking
- See What You Print
- Smart card
- 3D printing
