= ISO Standards for colour ink jet printers =

In 2006, the ISO/IEC (International Organization for Standardization/International Electrotechnical Commission) published the International Standard for determining the ink cartridge yield for colour inkjet printers and multifunctional devices. This standard is used to prescribe the test method that manufacturers and test labs use to determine ink jet cartridge yields. It also standardizes the appropriate method of describing the yield of cartridges in documentation supplied to the consumer by the manufacturer. Manufacturers of printers or devices that use colour ink jet technology are meant to abide by this standard when testing for, and labeling the estimated yields of their products.

The testing focused on sampling yields generated from typical business consumer printing applications. The judgment of total yield was defined by fade, marked by a depletion of ink in the cartridge, or automatic stop, caused by an "Ink Out" detection function.

== Methodology: Notable Elements ==
All printers are to be set up using priming cartridges. These cartridges are for calibration purposes, and not used in the actual testing procedure. Testing of print devices is to be done in a semi-continuous mode at rated speed. It was noted that this type of testing procedure may not be typical of some common usage patterns for print devices, as in office settings for instance. Quote "the yield experienced by a given user may vary significantly from the yield measured by this test method". The temperature of the testing environment should rest at an average of 23 Degrees Celsius. Paper used in the testing procedure must approximate the medium weight paper and conform to the printers approved specifications.

The full standard is published by the ISO/IEC JTC 1/SC 28 subcommittee.

== Disclosure of Information Guidelines for Manufacturers ==
Manufacturers must include the following information in their user manuals, marketing materials or packaging when declaring the yield of an ink jet cartridge:

Result derived from testing using ISO/IEC 24711.

Description that the additional yield values have been determined using the procedure defined in ISO/IEC 24711 using the test page defined in ISO/IEC 19752.

The value obtained was using a continuous printing procedure.
