= Printable =

Printable (noun: printability) usually refers to something suitable for printing:

- Printable character
- Printable version
- Printability of paper, see paper and ink testing

== See also ==
- Quoted-printable
