= Stored energy printer =

Type of computer printer

A stored energy printer is a computer printer that uses the energy stored in a spring or magnetic field to push a hammer into a ribbon to print a dot. It is a type of impact printer.

As compared to dot matrix printers that print a single column of dots at a time, this printer generally creates an entire line of dots at a time. Therefore, it is also known as a line matrix printer.

An advantage of this technology is its low running costs: printer hammers have a lifespan of millions to billions of dots, and ink is transferred using conventional typewriter-style ribbons.

== Technology ==
The most common printer to use this technology was the line-matrix printer made by Printronix and its licensees. In this type, the hammers are machined from an oval of magnetically permeable stainless steel, and the hammer-tips form vertical rows. The hammers are arranged as a "hammerbank"; a type of comb that oscillates horizontally to produce a line of dots. The original technology was patented by Printronix in 1974.

The tungsten carbide hammer is brazed to the center-top of a leaf spring. The top of this stiff spring is initially held back by a magnetic pole-piece. To produce a dot, an electromagnetic coil wrapped around the pole-piece neutralizes the magnetic field, causing the spring to release the hammer and hit the ribbon and the paper behind it, leaving behind the printed dot.

Character matrix printers have also been produced.

== Improvements ==
Recent designs have performed complex optimizations in the magnetic circuit, and eliminated unwanted resonances in the spring. The result was a near-doubling of speed. Other improvements include the use of electrical discharge machining to produce complex, three-dimensional hammers that trade-off the magnetic circuit, mechanical resonances, and printing speed.

Normal wear occurs on the pole piece when the spring rubs against it as it returns. This eventually requires the pole pieces to be reground and recertified. However, using hexavalent chrome plating on the pole-piece, combined with careful design, more than doubles speeds and improves life-span, allowing approximately a billion impressions per hammer.
