= See What You Print =

SWYP (See What You Print) is a printer concept developed by technology product design firm Artefact. The concept was released in 2011. It features simplified interactions and a touch screen that shows the user exactly what the print output will be.

== Awards ==
The SWYP concept was the recipient of two industry awards. It received a Braun Prize Silver Award in 2012. It also received an IXDA Interaction Award for disruptive interaction design.
