= Line matrix printer =

Type of impact printer

A line matrix printer is a computer printer that is a compromise between a line printer and a dot matrix printer. A line matrix printer prints page-wide lines of dots at a time, building up a line of text by printing lines of dots.

== Applications ==
Line matrix printers were used for high-speed printing applications They were used to produce invoices, bank statements, product shipment and transportation documentation as well as product compliance labels.

Line matrix printers can print text, bar codes and graphics.

When implemented as impact printers, they could be the least expensive to operate per page.

== How it works ==
Dot matrix printers were widely used because of their low cost per page. Dot matrix printers are divided into two main groups: serial dot matrix printers and line matrix printers.

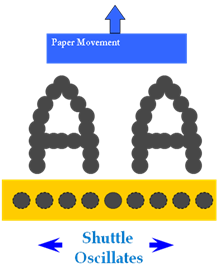
Line matrix mechanism

A serial dot matrix printer has a print head that runs back and forth, or in an up and down motion, on the page and prints by impact, striking an ink-soaked cloth ribbon against the paper, much like the print mechanism on a typewriter. However, unlike a typewriter or daisy wheel printer, letters are drawn out of a dot matrix, and thus, varied fonts and arbitrary graphics can be produced. Because the printing involves mechanical pressure, these printers can create carbon copies and carbonless copies.

Both line matrix and serial dot matrix printers use pins to strike against the inked ribbon, making dots on the paper and forming the desired characters. The difference is that a line matrix printer uses a hammer bank (or print-shuttle) instead of print head. This print-shuttle has hammers instead of print wires, and these hammers are arranged in a horizontal row instead in vertical column. The hammer bank uses the same technology as the permanent magnet print head with the small difference that instead of print wires the print-shuttle has hammers.

The permanent magnetic field holds the hammer spring in stressed, ready to strike position. The driver sends electric current to hammer coil, which creates an electromagnetic field opposing the permanent magnetic field. When the two fields equalize, the energy stored in the spring is released to strike the hammer against the ribbon and print a dot on the paper.

During the printing process the print-shuttle vibrates in horizontal direction with high speed while the print hammers are fired selectively. Each hammer prints a series of dots in horizontal direction for one pass of the shuttle, then paper advances at one step and the shuttle prints the following row of dots.
