= ISO/IEC JTC 1/SC 28 =

ISO/IEC JTC 1/SC 28 Office equipment is a standardization subcommittee of the Joint Technical Committee ISO/IEC JTC 1 of the International Organization for Standardization (ISO) and the International Electrotechnical Commission (IEC), that develops and facilitates international standards, technical reports, and technical specifications within the field of office equipment and products, and systems composed of combinations of office equipment. The group's main focus lies within the area of printers and copiers. The international secretariat of ISO/IEC JTC 1/SC 28 is the Japanese Industrial Standards Committee (JISC) located in Japan.

== History ==
ISO/IEC JTC 1/SC 28 was established in 1989 at the JTC 1's second Plenary in Paris, France. The creation of the subcommittee came as a result of the proposal for a subcommittee on office equipment that was submitted by Japan, and accepted by JTC 1. At this plenary, the scope of ISO/IEC JTC 1/SC 28 was agreed upon, and has remained the scope of the subcommittee throughout its history. The initial secretariat of ISO/IEC JTC 1/SC 28 was the Swiss Association for Standardization (SNV), located in Switzerland. However, in 1997, the Brazilian National Standards Organization (ABNT), located in Brazil, became the new secretariat. In October 2002, the secretariat position was succeeded by JISC.

== Scope ==
The scope of ISO/IEC JTC 1/SC 28 is “Standardization of basic characteristics, test methods and other related items, excluding such interfaces as user system interfaces, communication interfaces and protocols, of office equipment and products such as Printers, Copying Equipments, Digital scanners, Facsimile equipment and systems composed of combinations of office equipment”.

== Structure ==
ISO/IEC JTC 1/SC 28 is made up of one advisory group, ISO/IEC JTC 1/SC 28/AG, and four active working groups (WGs), each of which carries out specific tasks in standards development within the field of office equipment. Working groups can be disbanded if the group's working area is no longer applicable to standardization needs, or established if new working areas arise. The focus of each working group is described in the group's terms of reference. Active working groups of ISO/IEC JTC 1/SC 28 are:

Working Group	Working Area
ISO/IEC JTC 1/SC 28/WG 2	Consumables
ISO/IEC JTC 1/SC 28/WG 3	Productivity
ISO/IEC JTC 1/SC 28/WG 4	Image quality assessment
ISO/IEC JTC 1/SC 28/WG 5	Office colour

== Collaborations ==
ISO/IEC JTC 1/SC 28 works in close collaboration with a number of other organizations or subcommittees, both internal and external to ISO or IEC, in order to avoid conflicting or duplicative work. Organizations internal to ISO or IEC that collaborate with or are in liaison to ISO/IEC JTC 1/SC 28 include:

- ISO/IEC JTC 1, Information technology
- ISO/TC 6, Paper, board and pulps
- ISO/TC 42, Photography
- ISO/TC 130, Graphic technology
- ISO/TC 130/WG 2, Prepress data exchange
- ISO/TC 130/WG 3, Process control and related metrology
- ISO/TC 171, Document management applications
- ISO/TC 171/SC 1, Quality
- ISO/TC 171/SC 2, Application issues
- IEC TC 100/TA 2, Audio, video, and multimedia systems and equipment; Colour measurement and management

Some organizations external to ISO or IEC that collaborate with or are in liaison to ISO/IEC JTC 1/SC 28, include:

- International Commission on Illumination (CIE); CIE Division 1 and 8
- Ecma International, TC 38
- International Color Consortium (ICC)
- World Meteorological Organization (WMO)

== Member countries ==
Countries pay a fee to ISO to be members of subcommittees.

The 11 "P" (participating) members of ISO/IEC JTC 1/SC 28 are: Austria, China, Germany, Italy, Japan, Republic of Korea, Netherlands, Philippines, Russian Federation, United Kingdom, and United States of America.

The 21 "O" (observing) members of ISO/IEC JTC 1/SC 28 are: Argentina, Belgium, Bosnia and Herzegovina, Czech Republic, Finland, France, Ghana, Hungary, India, Indonesia, Islamic Republic of Iran, Kazakhstan, Kenya, Malaysia, Poland, Romania, Saudi Arabia, Serbia, South Africa, Switzerland, and Thailand.

== Published standards ==
ISO/IEC JTC 1/SC 28 currently has 50 published standards within the field of office equipment, including:

ISO/IEC Standard	Title	Status	Description	WG
ISO/IEC 19752	Information technology – Method for the determination of toner cartridge yield for monochromatic electrophotographic printers and multi-function devices that contain printer components	Published (2004)	Specifies the evaluation of toner cartridge yield for toner containing cartridges for monochrome, electrophotographic printers	2
ISO/IEC 19798	Method for the determination of toner cartridge yield for colour printers and multi-function devices that contain printer components	Published (2007)	“Defines a method for testing and calculation of average yield measured in the number of standard pages for a colour toner cartridge and specific printer printing system in a semi-continuous mode under a defined set of conditions”	2
ISO/IEC 24711	Method for the determination of ink cartridge yield for colour inkjet printers and multi-function devices that contain printer components	Published (2007)	ISO Standards for colour ink jet printers. Defines a method for testing and calculation of average yield measured in the number of standard pages for a colour inkjet cartridge and a specific printer printing in a semi-continuous mode under a defined set of conditions”	2
ISO/IEC 24734	Information technology – Office equipment – Method for measuring digital printing productivity	Published (2014)	“Specifies a method for measuring the productivity of digital printing devices with various office applications and print job characteristics”	3
ISO/IEC 24735	Information technology – Office equipment – Method for measuring digital copying productivity	Published (2012)	Specifies a method for measuring copying device and multifunctional device productivity	3
ISO/IEC TS 24790	Information technology – Office equipment – Measurement of image quality attributes for hardcopy output – Monochrome text and graphic images	Published (2012)	Specifies device-independent image quality attributes, measurement methods, and analytical procedures for describing the quality of output images from hardcopy devices	4
ISO/IEC TS 29112	Information technology – Office equipment – Test charts and methods for measuring monochrome printer resolution	Published (2012)	Defines the methods for the measurement of print quality characteristics contributing to the perceived resolution of reflection mode monochrome printed pages produced by digital electro-photographic printers	4
ISO/IEC TR 29186	Information technology – Office equipment – Test method of color gamut mapping algorithm for office color softcopy and hardcopy	Published (2012)	Supplement to CIE 156:2004, and is applicable for use in evaluating the color gamut mapping algorithms for office color softcopy and hardcopy equipment	5
ISO/IEC 24700	Quality and performance of office equipment that contains reused components	Published (2005)	Specifies product characteristics for use in an original equipment manufacturer's or authorized third party's declaration of conformity to demonstrate that a marketed product that contains reused components performs equivalently to a product made of new components, meeting equivalent to new component specifications and performance criteria, and continues to meet safety and environmental criteria required by responsible built products	
ISO/IEC 28360 free	Information technology – Office equipment – Determination of chemical emission rates from electronic equipment	Published (2012)	Specifies the methods to determine chemical emission rates of analyte from information and communication technology and consumer electronics equipment during intended operation in an Emission Test Chamber (ETC)	

== See also ==
- ISO/IEC JTC 1
- List of ISO standards
- Japanese Industrial Standards Committee
- International Organization for Standardization
- International Electrotechnical Commission
