= Printer-friendly =

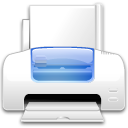
A printer icon.

Printer-friendly is a term used on the Internet to describe a version of a web page formatted for printing. Normally, web pages include information and navigation content that is only useful while browsing the website. Printer-friendly pages are designed to fit on an 8.5"x11" or A4 sheet (see paper sizes) and include only the content (plain text and images) of the page, along with source information. Inline hyperlinks become ordinary text, links on the margins may or may not be shown. Additionally link target URLs may be shown. Navigation tools such as on-screen menus are not included.

Printer-friendly pages are used not only for printing onto paper, but also for storage on machine-readable media such as hard drives, floppy disks or CD-ROMs. They are usually accessed through a link on the standard page. Often the link will be indicated by a printer icon.

There are several ways that website pages can be easily made printer friendly. One way is to use JavaScript, which can be used to create a printer-friendly version of a website page by hiding elements of the page that are not required for printing. This way, all of the content can be laid out on an 8.5"x11" or A4 sheet in an orderly fashion. Another way to create printer-friendly web pages is to use a CSS style sheet. A CSS style sheet is a set of instructions that tell the web browser how to display a web page. By using a separate style sheet specifically for printing, a web page can be laid out to fit on an 8.5"x11" or A4 sheet. The most important thing to remember when creating printer-friendly web pages is to keep the layout simple. Avoid using complicated text formatting and images, as these can cause problems when printing. Also, remember to include source information on the page, such as the website address and the date the page was printed.
