= Barcode printer =

Computer peripheral to print barcode labels or tags

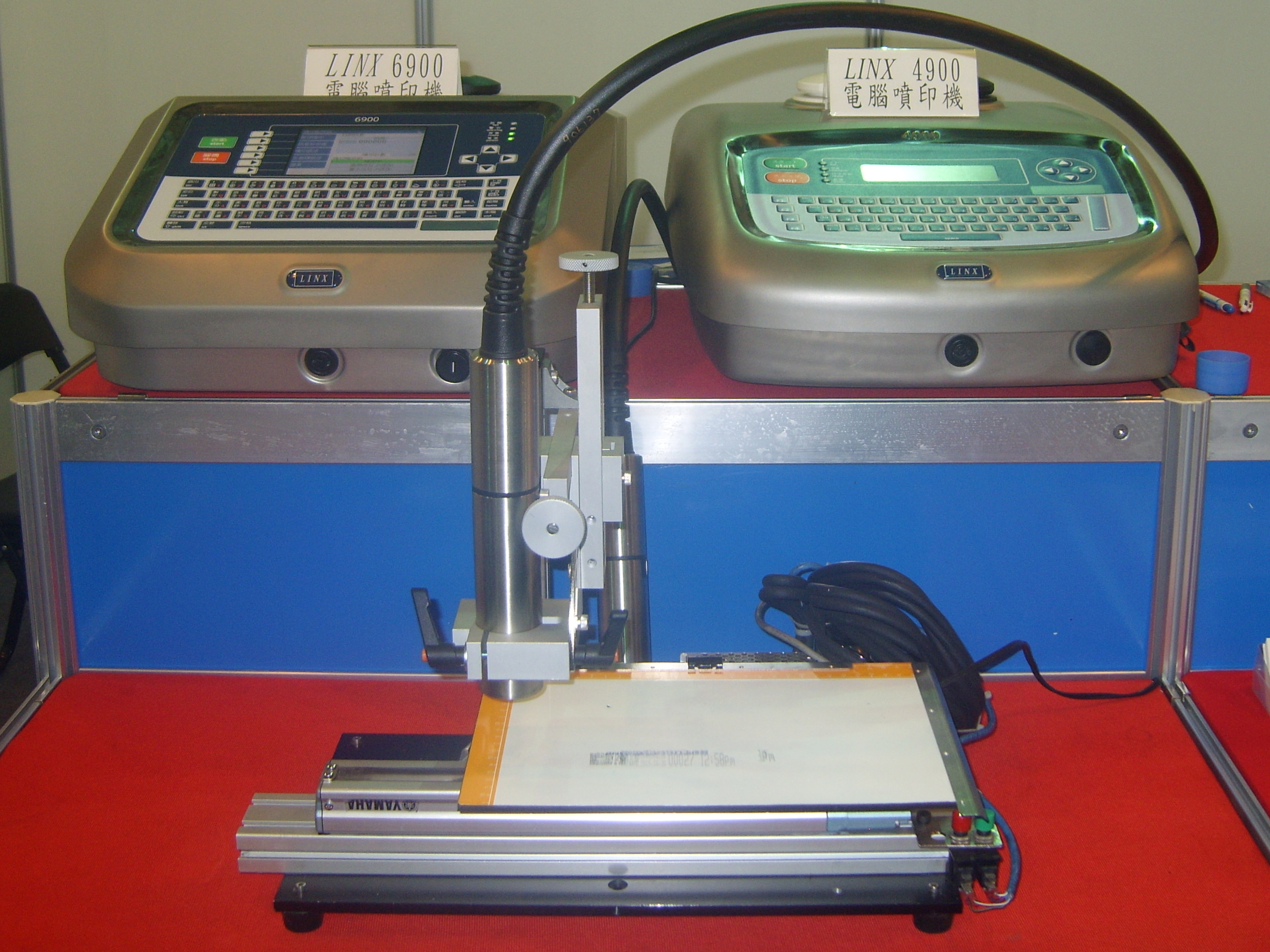
A barcode printer

A barcode printer is a computer peripheral for printing barcode labels or tags that can be attached to, or printed directly on, physical objects. Barcode printers are commonly used to label cartons before shipment, or to label retail items with UPCs or EANs.

The most common barcode printers employ one of two different printing technologies. Direct thermal printers use a printhead to generate heat that causes a chemical reaction in specially designed paper that turns the paper black. Thermal transfer printers also use heat, but instead of reacting the paper, the heat melts a waxy or resin substance on a ribbon that runs over the label or tag material. The heat transfers ink from the ribbon to the paper. Direct thermal printers are generally less expensive, but they produce labels that can become illegible if exposed to heat, direct sunlight, or chemical vapors.

Barcode printers are designed for different markets. Industrial barcode printers are used in large warehouses and manufacturing facilities. They have large paper capacities, operate faster and have a longer service life. For retail and office environments, desktop barcode printers are most common.

== Uses of barcode printers ==
A barcode printer is a specialized device designed to create and print barcodes, which are machine-readable codes consisting of parallel lines or a matrix of squares. These barcodes serve various purposes across different industries. Some common uses of barcode printers include:

- Retail Industry
  - Product Labeling: Barcode printers are used to generate and print barcode labels for products. These labels contain essential information such as product name, price, and unique identification codes.
  - Inventory Management: Barcodes help smooth inventory processes by allowing quick and accurate tracking of stock levels. Barcode labels on items make it easier to monitor and manage inventory in real-time.
- Manufacturing:
  - Work-in-Progress Tracking: Barcode printers are used to create labels for work-in-progress items on the manufacturing line. This facilitates tracking and ensures that each stage of production is properly documented.
  - Asset Management: Barcodes can be applied to machinery and equipment, allowing for efficient tracking of assets within a manufacturing facility.
- Healthcare:
  - Patient Identification: Barcode wristbands are commonly used in healthcare settings to identify patients accurately. These wristbands can be generated by barcode printers and help prevent errors in patient care.
  - Medication Administration: Barcodes on medication packaging assist healthcare professionals in ensuring the right medication is given to the right patient at the right dosage.
- Logistics and Distribution:
  - Shipping Labels: Barcode printers are essential for creating shipping labels that contain information such as destination, shipping method, and tracking numbers. This ensures accurate and efficient shipment handling.
  - Warehouse Management: Barcodes on products and storage locations within a warehouse facilitate quick and error-free tracking of goods, reducing the likelihood of errors in order fulfillment.
- Library and Asset Tracking:
  - Library Management: Barcodes are used in libraries to catalog books, making it easy to check items in and out, as well as track their location within the library.
  - Asset Tracking: Barcode labels help organizations track and manage their assets, from computers and office equipment to tools and machinery.
- Event Ticketing:
  - Ticketing Systems: Barcodes on event tickets simplify the check-in process for attendees. Scanning the barcode at the entrance ensures a quick and secure method of admission.
- Government and Identification:
  - ID Cards: Barcodes on government-issued identification cards, such as driver's licenses and passports, help streamline identity verification processes.
- Point of Sale (POS) Systems:
  - Transaction Processing: Barcodes on products enable quick and accurate scanning at the point of sale, expediting the checkout process for retailers and improving overall customer experience.

== See also ==
- Computer printer
- Label printer
