= ISO/IEC 19752 =

ISO standard method

ISO/IEC 19752 Information technology — Method for the determination of toner cartridge yield for monochromatic electrophotographic printers and multi-function devices that contain printer components is an ISO/IEC standard method for the determination of toner cartridge yield for monochrome laser printers, introduced in June 2004 and updated in 2017.

Traditionally, printer manufacturers did not employ a standard, well-defined methodology for measuring toner cartridge yield. The most widely used description of cartridge capacity was "number of printed pages at approximately 5% coverage", with final results depending on a number of factors.

In contrast, ISO/IEC 19752 strives for a comprehensive and rigorous definition of the measurement process with the purpose of creating clear and objective criteria for comparison of cartridge yields. In particular, the standard provides a detailed definition and description of:

- Test preparations and environmental conditions
- Sample size (at least 3 printers with 3 cartridges each)
- Paper type
- Print mode
- Test document (provided in PDF format)
- Cartridge and printer source (not supplied by manufacturer; purchased on the open market from at least three different sources)
- Error and process handling
- End-of-life criteria (for example, how many times the cartridges should be shaken)

== See also ==
- ISO/IEC JTC 1/SC 28

== Sources ==
- ISO/IEC 19752:2004 at www.iso.org
- ISO/IEC 19752:2017
  - "ISO/IEC 19752:2017". www.iso.org.
- ISO Standard 19752:2004 Table
