= Facsimile =

Copy or reproduction of an original work

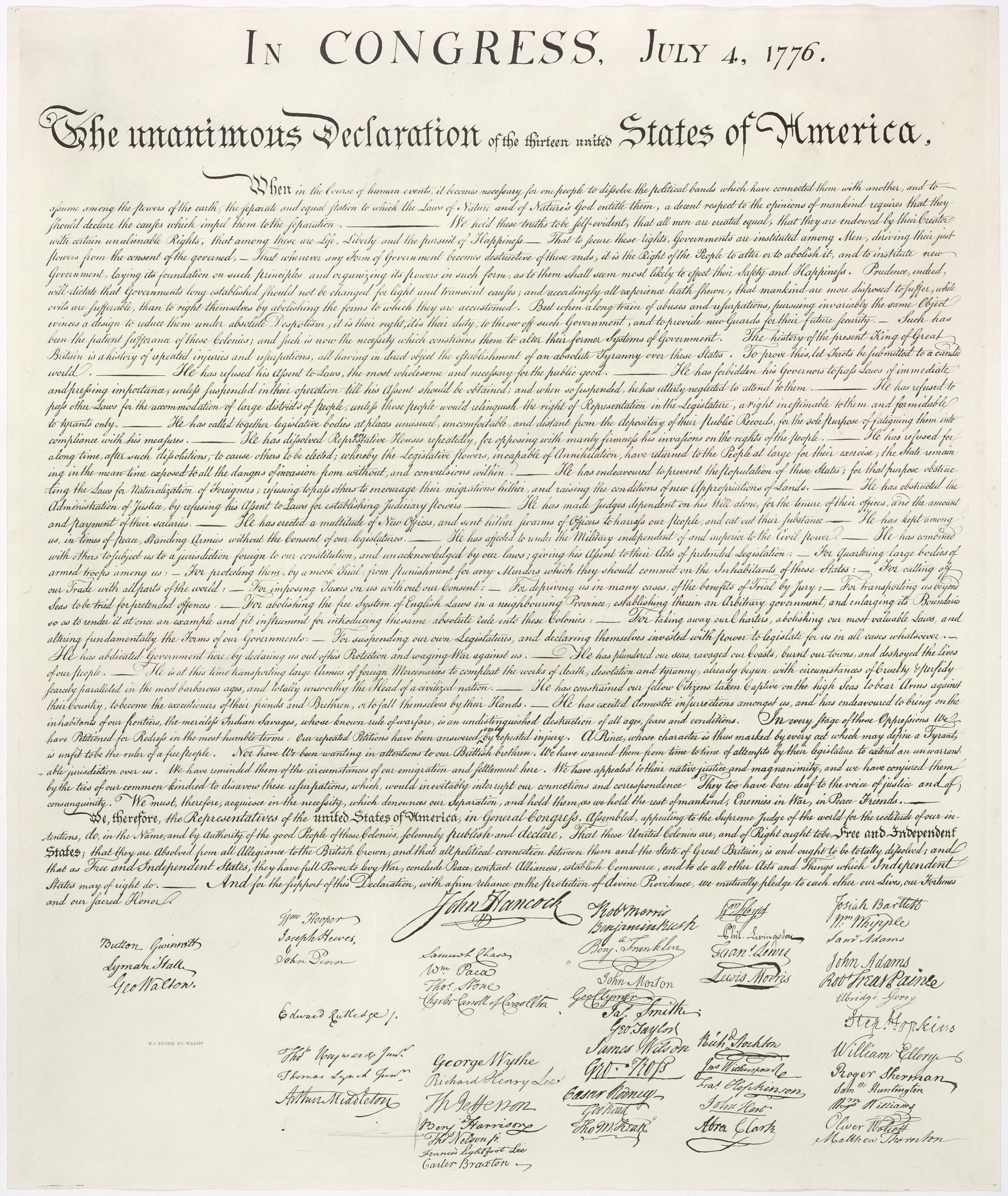
1823 facsimile of the United States Declaration of Independence made by William Stone

A facsimile (from Latin fac simile, "to make alike") is a copy or reproduction of an old book, manuscript, map, art print, or other item of historical value that is as true to the original source as possible. It differs from other forms of reproduction by attempting to replicate the source quite accurately in scale, color, condition, and other material qualities. For books and manuscripts, this also entails a complete copy of all pages; hence, an incomplete copy is a "partial facsimile". Facsimiles are sometimes used by scholars to research a source that they do not have access to otherwise, and by museums and archives for media preservation and conservation. Many are sold commercially, often accompanied by a volume of commentary.

The term "fax" is a shortened form of "facsimile", though most faxes are not reproductions of the quality expected in a true facsimile.

== Facsimiles in the age of mechanical reproduction ==
Advances in the art of facsimile are closely related to advances in printmaking. Maps, for instance, were the focus of early explorations in making facsimiles, although these examples often lack the rigidity to the original source that is now expected. An early example is the Abraham Ortelius map (1598). Innovations during the 18th century, especially in the realms of lithography and aquatint, facilitated an explosion in the number of facsimiles of old master drawings that could be studied from afar.

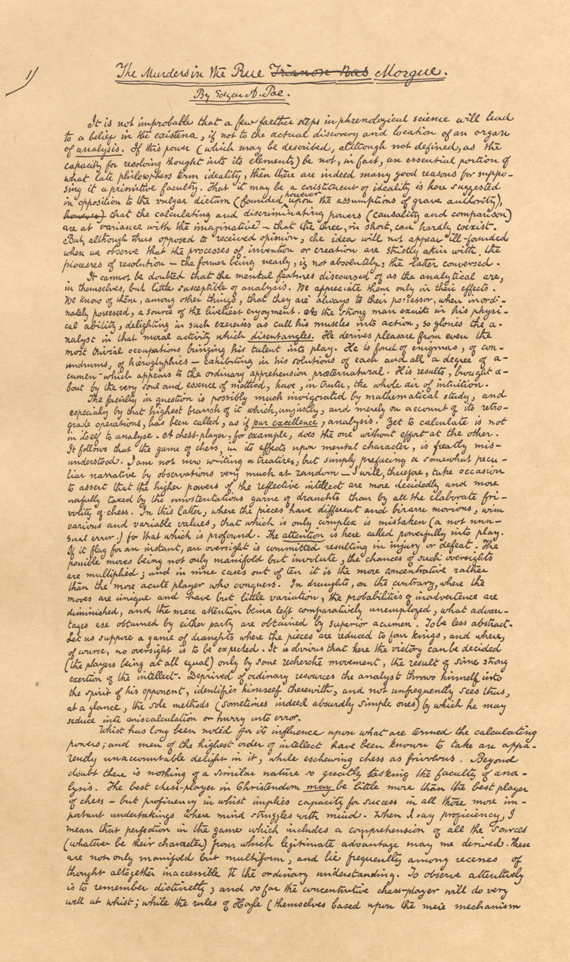
Facsimile of Edgar Allan Poe's original manuscript for The Murders in the Rue Morgue

In the past, techniques and devices such as the philograph (tracing an original through a transparent plane), photostat, hectograph, or lithograph were used to create facsimiles. More recently, facsimiles have been made by the use of some form of photographic technique. For documents, a facsimile most often refers to document reproduction by a photocopy machine. In the digital age, an image scanner, a personal computer, and a desktop printer can be used to make a facsimile.

A separate category consists of the so-called digital facsimiles, which are meant to be stored, viewed, and sometimes edited or annotated on a computer. These are often available online in repositories that consist of manuscripts from a particular location or collection. Such digital facsimiles are considered separate objects from the manuscripts or books that they represent. They are an important research aid, especially for historians.

== Facsimiles and conservation ==
Important illuminated manuscripts like Les Très Riches Heures du duc de Berry are not only on display to the public as facsimiles, but available in high quality to scholars. However, unlike normal book reproductions, facsimiles remain truer to the original colors—which is especially important for illuminated manuscripts—and preserve defects.

Facsimiles are best suited to printed or hand-written documents, and not to items such as three-dimensional objects or oil paintings with unique surface texture. Reproductions of those latter objects are often referred to as replicas.

== See also ==
- Record type, a family of typefaces designed to allow the publication of medieval manuscripts in semi-facsimile
