= Gestetner =

Type of duplicator machine and brand owned by Ricoh

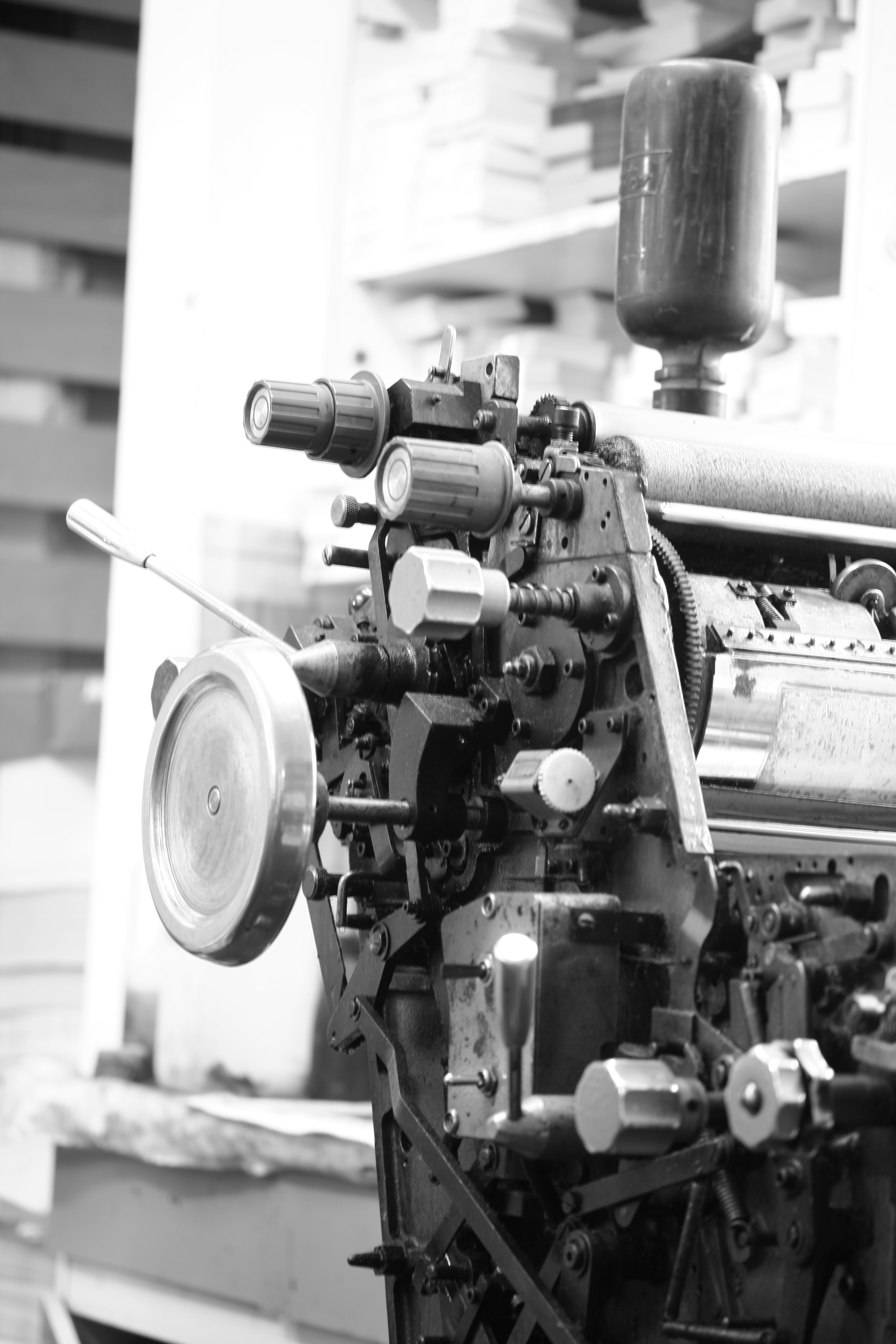
An A4-size Gestetner offset-printing machine

The Gestetner is a type of duplicating machine named after its inventor, David Gestetner (1854–1939). During the 20th century, the term Gestetner was used as a verb—as in Gestetnering. The Gestetner company established its base in London, filing its first patent in 1879. The business grew, remaining within the control of the Gestetner family, and acquiring other businesses. In 1995, the Gestetner company was acquired by the Ricoh Corporation of Japan.

== History ==
David Gestetner was born in Hungary in 1854, and after working in Vienna and New York, he moved to London, England, filing his first copying patent there in 1879. A later patent in 1881 was for the Cyclostyle, a stylus that was part of the Cyclograph copying device. That same year, he also established the Gestetner Cyclograph Company to produce duplicating machines, stencils, styli, ink rollers and related products. The Gestetner works opened in 1906 at Tottenham Hale, north London, and employed several thousand people until the 1990s. Gestetner's inventions were successful, and branch offices sold and serviced Gestetner products in 153 different countries.

The Gestetner Company expanded quickly during the early and mid-20th century. Management was passed to David Gestetner's son, Sigmund Gestetner, and from him to his sons, David and Jonathan. Gestetner acquired other companies during the years: Nashua (later changed to Nashuatec), Rex Rotary, Hanimex and Savin.

In 1995 the international Gestetner Company, and its brand, was acquired by the Ricoh company of Japan. The company was renamed NRG Group PLC, and markets and services Ricoh products under its three main brand names, primarily in Europe, South Africa and the Middle East, but also through dealers throughout the world. In Europe, Gestetner Group became NRG Group, which on 1 April 2007 became Ricoh Europe. On that date Ricoh merged its Gestetner dealer network with the Lanier dealer network that had been selling Lanier-branded products on behalf of Ricoh for the North American market. Ricoh indicated that the merger's rationale was based on the fact that both "Gestetner and Lanier brands have been marketing identical products for many years". Thus, Gestetner's American customers can simply substitute Lanier-branded products for previous Gestetner-branded products even though Lanier-branded products are the same as Ricoh and Savin.

== The Gestetner Cyclograph ==
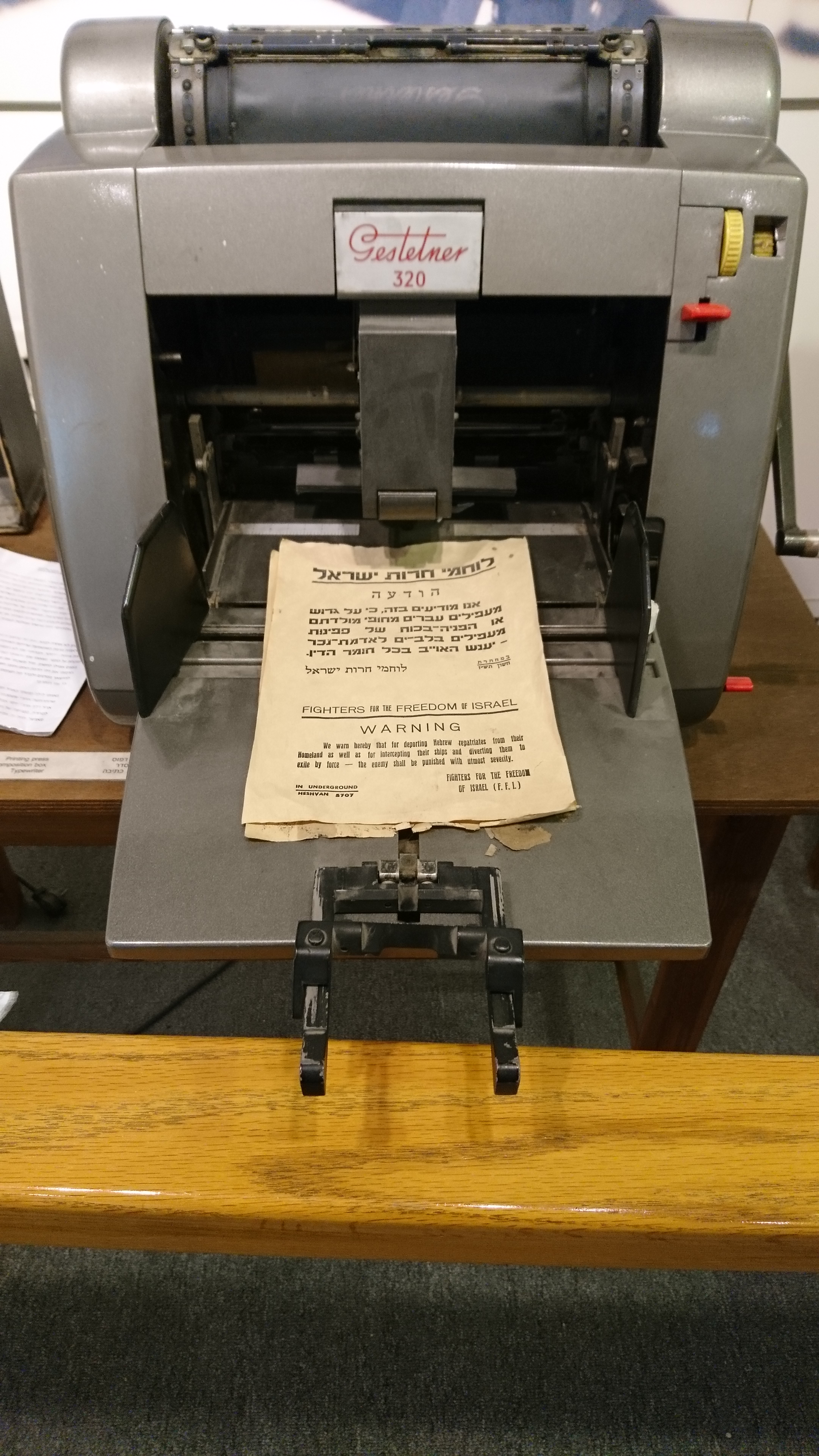
A Gestetner 320

The Gestetner Cyclograph was a stencil-method duplicator that used a thin sheet of paper coated with wax (originally kite paper was used), which was written upon with a special stylus that left a broken line through the stencil, removing the paper's wax coating. Ink was forced through the stencil (originally by an ink roller), and it left its impression on a white sheet of paper.

Until this time, any "short copy runs" which were needed for the conduct of a business—e.g., for the production of 10–50 copies of contracts, agreements, or letters—had to be copied by hand. (If more were needed, the document would have to go to the printers.) After the run had been copied, business partners had to read each one to ensure that they were all exactly the same, and that human error had not resulted in any aberrant copies. The process was time-consuming and frustrating. The stencil-copy method meant that only one copy had to be read, as all copies were mechanically identical. Gestetner had therefore revolutionised the office copying process.

Gestetner developed his invention, with the stencil eventually being placed on a screen wrapped around a pair of revolving drums, onto which ink was placed. The drums were revolved and ink, spread evenly across the surface of the screen by a pair of cloth-covered rollers, was forced through the cuts made in the stencil and transferred onto a sheet of paper which was fed through the duplicator and pressed by pressure rollers against the lower drum. Each complete rotation of the screen fed and printed one sheet. Later models had a scanner, that scanned an original and burned holes through the "master" as it spun on a spinning drum.

Model 66 was perhaps the most famous Gestetner machine, designed by Raymond Loewy; examples are currently housed in the British Museum and Churchill's War Bunker in Whitehall.

After the first typewriter was invented, a stencil was created which could be typed on, thus creating copies similar to printed newspapers and books, instead of handwritten material.

== See also ==
- Cyclostyle (copier)
- Mimeograph
- Photocopier
- Spirit duplicator
- Thermofax
- List of duplicating processes
