= David Gestetner =

Austrian inventor

- Gestetner Dávid
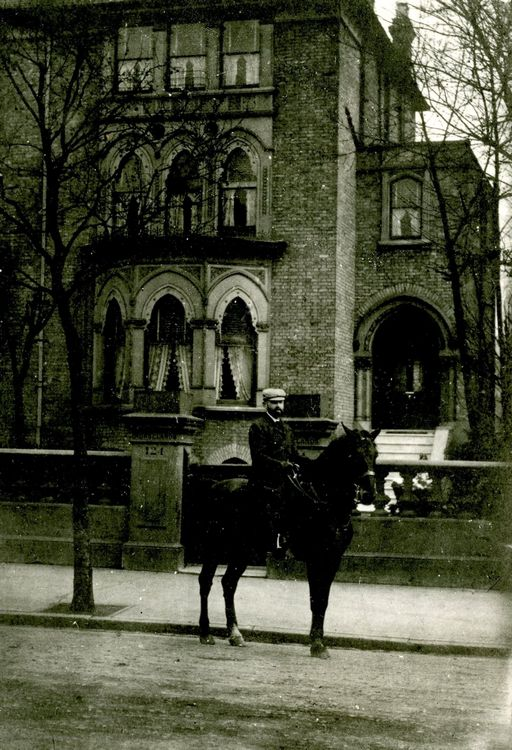
- David Gestetner outside his home at 124 Highbury New Park, London, circa 1905
- Born: 31 March 1854; Csorna, Kingdom of Hungary, Habsburg Empire
- Died: 8 March 1939 (aged 84); London, United Kingdom
- Known for: Gestetner, stencil duplicator, photocopier, nail clipper
- Children: Sidonie Gestetner Sigmund Gestetner
- Awards: John Scott Medal, Blue Plaque
- Scientific career
- Fields: Inventor

David Gestetner (31 March 1854 – 8 March 1939) was the inventor of the Gestetner stencil duplicator, the first piece of office equipment that allowed production of numerous copies of documents quickly and inexpensively. He also invented a new kind of nail clipper. Gestetner was awarded the John Scott Medal by The Franklin Institute in 1888.

On 12 March 2011 a Blue Plaque was placed on his home at 124 Highbury New Park in north London.

== Early life ==
The devoutly Jewish David Gestetner left Hungary to work in Vienna in the 1870s, where he began work at the stock exchange. One of his tasks was to make copies of the activity at the end of the day by repeatedly handwriting the results. He decided to try to find a better method, and his experiments eventually led him to invent the first method of reproducing documents by use of a stencil. He went on to work in Chicago, making kites out of Chinese paper.

Gestetner allegedly perceived the idea of the duplicating method after an ink-spill accident whilst vending kites in Chicago. After a pot of ink spilled over a pile of kites, he found that the same ink pattern remained throughout the pile. This inspired him to find a way to replicate the process for commercial use. Gestetner then moved to London, United Kingdom to produce his inventions and went on to achieve great commercial success.

== The device ==
See main article Gestetner Cyclograph

The stencil method used a thin sheet of paper coated with wax (originally kite paper was used), which was written upon with a special stylus that left a broken line through the stencil – breaking the paper and removing the wax covering. Ink was forced through the stencil – originally by an ink roller – and it left its impression on a white sheet of paper below. This was repeated again and again until sufficient copies were produced.

Until this time, any "short copy runs" which were needed for the conduct of a business (e.g., for the production of 10–50 copies of contracts, agreements, or letters) had to be copied by hand. (If more were needed, the document would have to go to the printers.) After the run had been copied, business partners had to read each one to ensure that they were all exactly the same, and that human error or tiredness had not introduced an error into one copy. The process was time consuming and frustrating for all. The stencil copy method meant that only one copy had to be read, as all copies were mechanically identical.

David Gestetner eventually moved to London, England and in 1881 established the Gestetner Cyclograph Company to produce stencils, styli and ink rollers. He guarded his invention through patents. He also invented other notable devices such as the nail-clipper and a type of ball-point pen. The Gestetner works opened in 1906 at Tottenham Hale, north London, and employed tens of thousands of people until the 1990s. His invention became an overnight international success, and he soon established an international chain of branches that sold and serviced his products.

During the ensuing years he further developed his invention, with the stencil eventually being placed on a screen wrapped around a pair of revolving drums, onto which ink was placed. The drums were revolved and ink, spread evenly across the surface of the screen by a pair of cloth-covered rollers, was forced through the cuts made in the stencil and transferred onto a sheet of paper which was fed through the duplicator and pressed by pressure rollers against the lower drum. Each complete rotation of the screen fed and printed one sheet. After the first typewriter was invented, a stencil was created which could be typed on, thus creating copies similar to printed newspapers and books, instead of handwritten material.

== Social effects ==
The stencil duplicator provided individuals with a means to produce their own uncensored and uncontrolled ideas and distribute them in public places (near factories, churches, government offices, parks etc.). Previously, producing mass numbers of copies required the co-operation of owners of printing presses, which required a large amount of capital. Owners of presses would not agree to publish opinions contrary to their own interest.

The Gestetner Company expanded quickly during the start and middle of the 20th century. Management was passed on to David Gestetner's son, Sigmund Gestetner, and from him to his sons, David and Jonathan. Gestetner acquired other companies during the years: Nashua (later changed to Nashuatec), Rex Rotary, Hanimex and Savin. Eventually a holding company was set up called NRG (N=Nashuatec, R= Rex Rotary, G= Gestetner).

In 1996, the international Gestetner Company was acquired by the Ricoh company of Japan. The company was renamed NRG Group, and markets and services Ricoh products under its three main brand names, primarily in Europe, South Africa and the Middle East, but also through dealers throughout the world.

== Blue Plaque ==
On 12 March 2011 a Blue Plaque was placed on Gestetner's home at 124 Highbury New Park. It was presented by Gestetner's grandson, Jonathan, and great-great grandchildren Harry Gestetner, aged 11, and Henrietta Hodgson, 13, accompanied by various relatives and descendants.

== See also ==
- Duplicator
- Gestetner
- Sigmund Gestetner
- Photocopier
- Nail clipper

== Sources ==
- Biographical Dictionary of Management, Thoemmes Continuum (for life dates).
- "Before Copies", Graphic Com Central.
- Proudfoot, W. B., The Origin of Stencil Duplicating, Hutchinson of London, 1972.
- Oxford Dictionary of National Biography.
