= Highbury New Park =

Street in Islington, London

Coordinates: 51°33′30.76″N 0°5′32.12″W

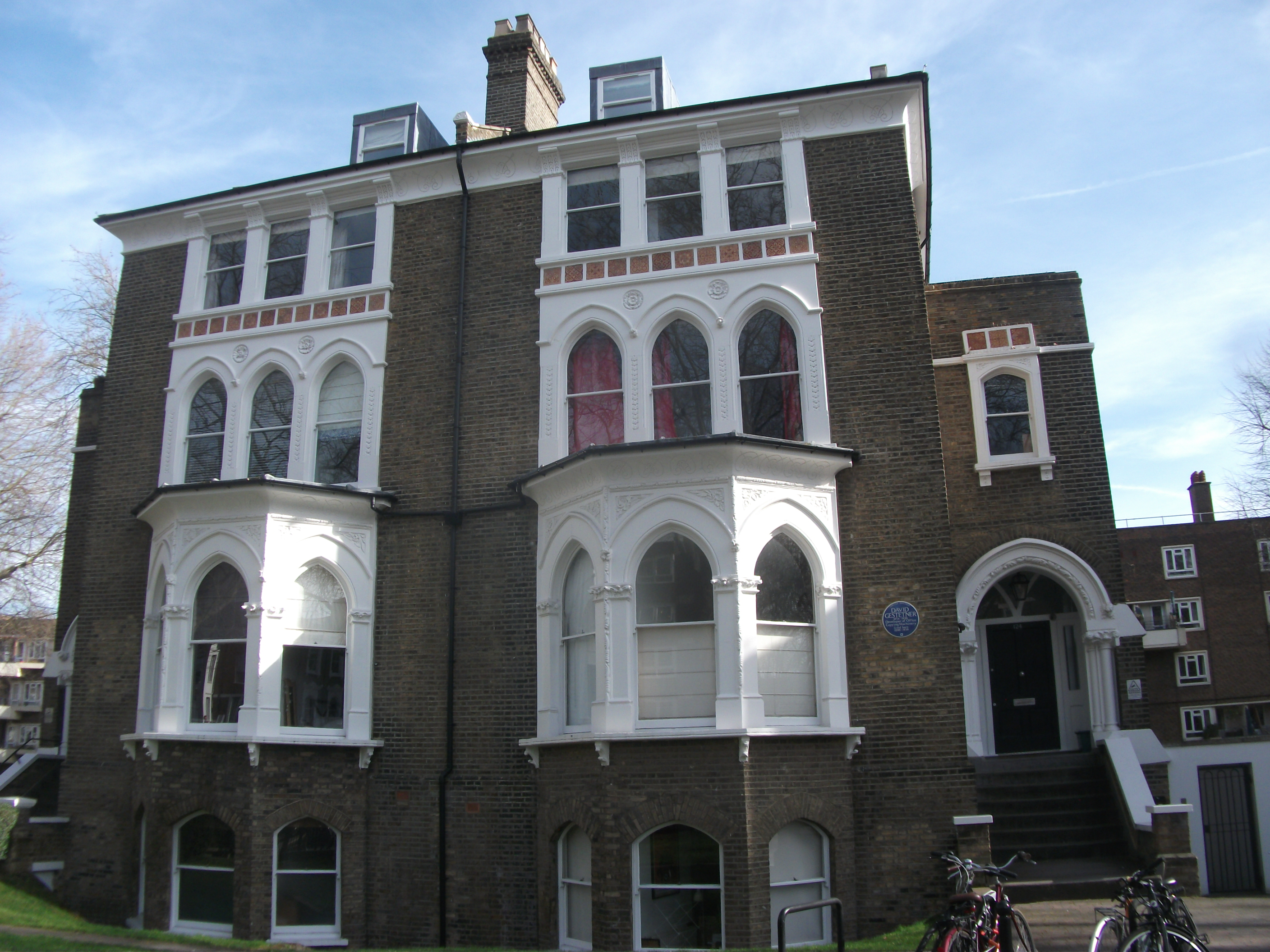
The former home of David Gestetner at number 124.

Highbury New Park is a street in Highbury in the London Borough of Islington which runs from Highbury Quadrant in the north to Highbury Grove in the south.

== Buildings ==
The road was developed by Henry Rydon from 1853 in order to attract prosperous city businessmen to the area and there are now a large number of grade II listed Victorian villas in the road.

== Notable former residents ==
- C. Washington Eves, No. 49. West Indies Merchant.
- David Gestetner, No. 124. Inventor.

== In literature ==
14 Highbury New Park is the setting of The Ghost Downstairs by Leon Garfield (1972).

== See also ==
- Highbury Park
