= List of duplicating processes =

This is a partial list of text and image duplicating processes used in business and government from the Industrial Revolution forward. Some are mechanical and some are chemical. There is naturally some overlap with printing processes and photographic processes, but the challenge of precisely duplicating business letters, forms, contracts, and other paperwork prompted some unique solutions as well. There were many short-lived inventions along the way.

== Duplicating processes ==
Within each type, the methods are arranged in very rough chronological order.

- Methods of copying handwritten letters
  - Manifold stylographic writer, using early "carbonic paper"
  - Letter copying book process
- Mechanical processes
  - Tracing to make accurate hand-drawn copies
  - Pantograph, manual device for making drawn copies without tracing, can also enlarge or reduce
- Printmaking, which includes engraving and etching
  - Relief printing including woodcut
  - Intaglio (printmaking) or copperplate engraving
  - Planographic printing
  - Line engraving

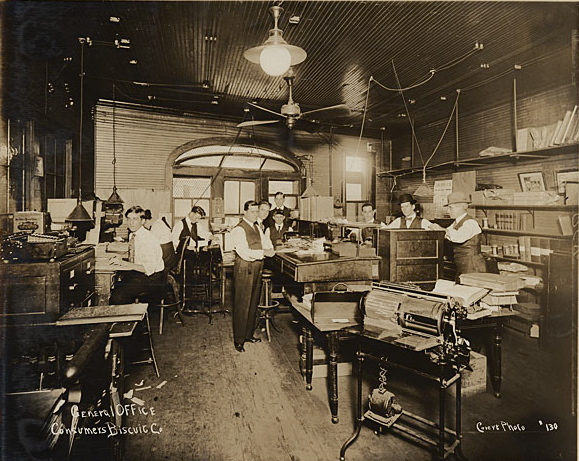
1917 office with a "Multigraph" duplicating machine at lower right

- Printing/Applied ink methods
  - Letterpress printing (via printing press)
  - Gelatin methods (also indirect method)
    - Hectograph
    - Collography, autocopyist
    - Chromograph, Copygraph, Polygraph
  - Flexography
  - Spirit duplicator (also Rexograph, Ditto machine, Banda machine, or Roneo)
- Lithographic processes
  - Transfer lithography
  - Anastatic lithography
  - Autographic process
  - Offset lithography
  - Photolithography
- Stencil-based copying methods
  - Papyrography
  - Electric pen, invented by Thomas Edison
  - Trypograph (also file plate process)
  - Cyclostyle, Neostyle
- Stencil-based machines
  - Mimeograph (also Roneo, Gestetner)
  - Digital Duplicators (also called CopyPrinters, e.g., Risograph and Gestetner)
- Typewriter-based copying methods
  - Carbon paper
  - Blueprint typewriter ribbon
  - Carbonless copy paper
- Photographic processes:
  - Reflex copying process (also reflectography, reflexion copying)
    - Breyertype, Playertype, Manul Process, Typon Process, Dexigraph, Linagraph
  - Daguerreotype
  - Salt print
  - Calotype (the first photo process to use a negative, from which multiple prints could be made)
  - Cyanotype
  - Photostat machine
  - Rectigraph
  - Airgraph (also V-mail)
  - Kodagraph autopositive paper
  - Kodagraph repro-negative paper
  - Diffusion transfer
    - Verifax, Copyproof
    - Photomechanical transfer (also PMT')
  - Duostat, duoprint
  - Retroflex (printing process)
  - Dual spectrum process
  - LightJet
  - Ozalid
- Chemical processes
  - Aniline process
  - Cyanotype (used for blueprints)
  - Diazotype (also whiteprint, ammonia print, or gas print)
- Heat-sensitivity methods
  - Thermofax (also thermography)
  - Eichner drycopy process
  - Adherography
- Electrostatic methods
  - Electrofax
  - Xerography, Photocopying
- Ultraviolet-sensitivity methods
  - APT process, for transferring drawings to animation cels
- Image scanning and digital printing
