= New North Road, Islington =

Street in the London boroughs of Islington and Hackney

Coordinates: 51°32′9.89″N 0°5′23.11″W

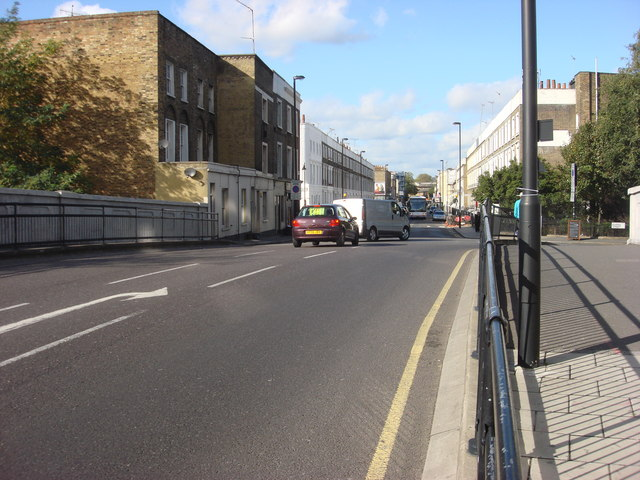
New North Road Bridge, Islington, crossing the Regent's Canal. The building formerly the Rydon's Arms is on the left adjacent to the first junction on that side of the road

The New North Road is a road in northern central London, forming part of a link road from the A1 at Highbury into the City of London at Moorgate. It is 0.8 miles (1.3 km) in length and is part of the A1200. This link road consists of Canonbury Road and New North Road, before several smaller sections to the south leading into the city.

This part of the link begins at the Essex Road crossroads in the London Borough of Islington: Canonbury Road enters from the north-west, whilst New North Road continues in a south-easterly direction. It continues south-east and crosses into the London Borough of Hackney, passing to the west of Shoreditch Park. It bears to the south, and ends at a junction with Pitfield Street. A link road continues shortly before the end of New North Road, becoming East Road for a short distance, before meeting up with City Road near Moorfields Eye Hospital and Old Street station.

== History ==
Highbury and Shoreditch Road Act 1812
- Act of Parliament
- Parliament of the United Kingdom
- Long title: An Act for making a Public Carriage Road from the present Turnpike Road, near the South End of Highbury Place, Islington, to Haberdashers Walk, in the Parish of Saint Leonard, Shoreditch, in the County of Middlesex.
- Citation: 52 Geo. 3. c. cliv

Dates
- Royal assent: 9 June 1812

Other legislation
- Repealed by: New North Road Act 1833

Status: Repealed

Text of statute as originally enacted

New North Road Act 1833
- Act of Parliament
- Parliament of the United Kingdom
- Long title: An Act for continuing certain Powers to the Trustees of the New North Road, leading from the South End of Highbury Place, Islington, to Haberdashers Walk in the Parish of Saint Leonard Shoreditch, in the County of Middlesex.
- Citation: 3 & 4 Will. 4. c. lxxxv

Dates
- Royal assent: 10 June 1833

Other legislation
- Repealed by: New North Road Act 1849

Status: Repealed

Text of statute as originally enacted

New North Road was built to provide a new route northwards from Old Street to Highbury, as outlined in a local act of Parliament, the Highbury and Shoreditch Road Act 1812 (52 Geo. 3. c. cliv): "An Act for making a Public Carriage Road from the present Turnpike Road, near the South End of Highbury Place, Islington to Haberdashers Walk, in the Parish of Saint Leonard, Shoreditch, in the County of Middlesex.

The road was completed in 1822 as one of several roads built to connect with the Great North Road. This was during a period of land development in south-east Islington. It was paid for by tolls which were abolished in 1864.

== Buildings ==
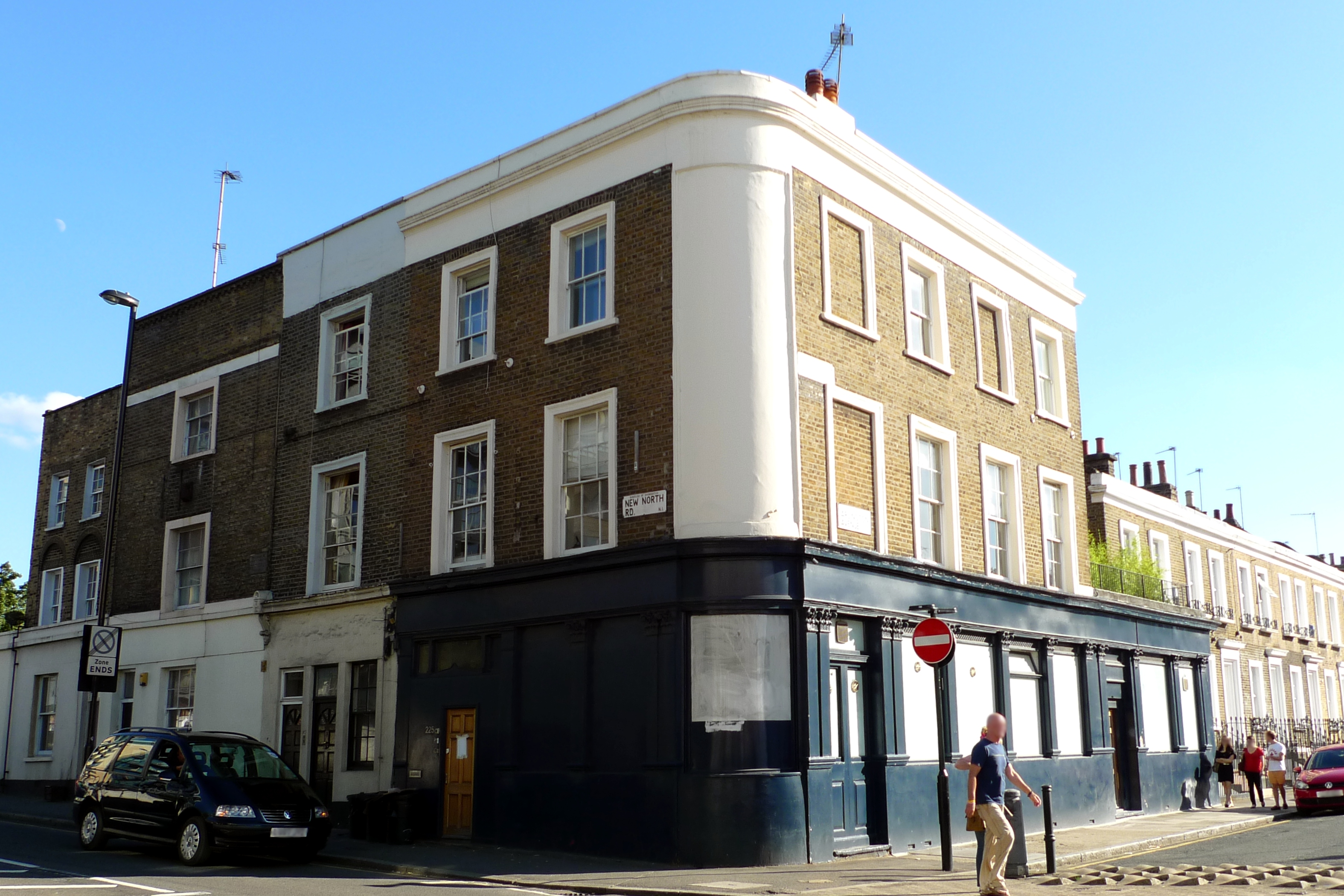
Building formerly the Rydon Arms

- Rydon Arms, 225 New North Road, (formerly 2 Russell Place, New North Road) London N1 7BG. No longer a public house this is a Grade II Listed Building. It is on the junction with Arlington Avenue and was part of a development by Henry Rydon.
