= Sigmund Gestetner =

British businessman and Zionist

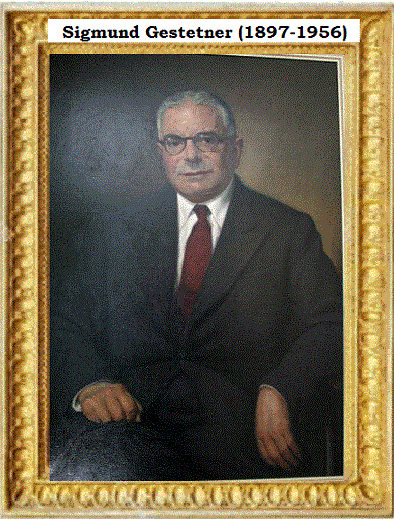
Portrait of Sigmund Gestetner

Sigmund Aviezer Gestetner (13 August 1897 – 16 April 1956) was a British philanthropist, Zionist, and businessman, serving as Managing Director of Gestetner and president of the Jewish National Fund of Great Britain.

== Early life ==
Born in London in 1897, he was the only son of Jewish inventor David Gestetner and attended City of London School until he joined the army at the age of 17, faking his age. He was gassed during World War 1, permanently affecting his health.

== Business and Zionism ==
Sigmund Gestetner is credited for the expansion of the firm bearing his name and passed on management to his wife, Henny Gestetner and later his two sons, David and Jonathan Gestetner. He was a supporter of the Zionist cause, serving as president of the Jewish National Fund and was active in the Joint Palestine Appeal in Great Britain. He worked closely with Chaim Weizmann, helping bring the Weizmann Institute of Science to Great Britain along with his wife, Henny. He was associated with the Aliyah Bet effort, helping bring Jews from concentration camps, partisans and those who had remained hidden to Israel during 1945-1948.

Gestetner commissioned the building of Highpoint I in 1935, however it was never used for its intended purpose of housing Gestetner staff.

== Legacy ==
Sigmund Gestetner died in Nice on 16 April 1956 of lung cancer, stemming from his injury attained during the war. He left behind three children, Sophie, David and Jonathan as well as his wife, Henny.
