= Highbury Park, London =

Street in Highbury, London

Coordinates: 51°33′20.41″N 0°5′53.19″W

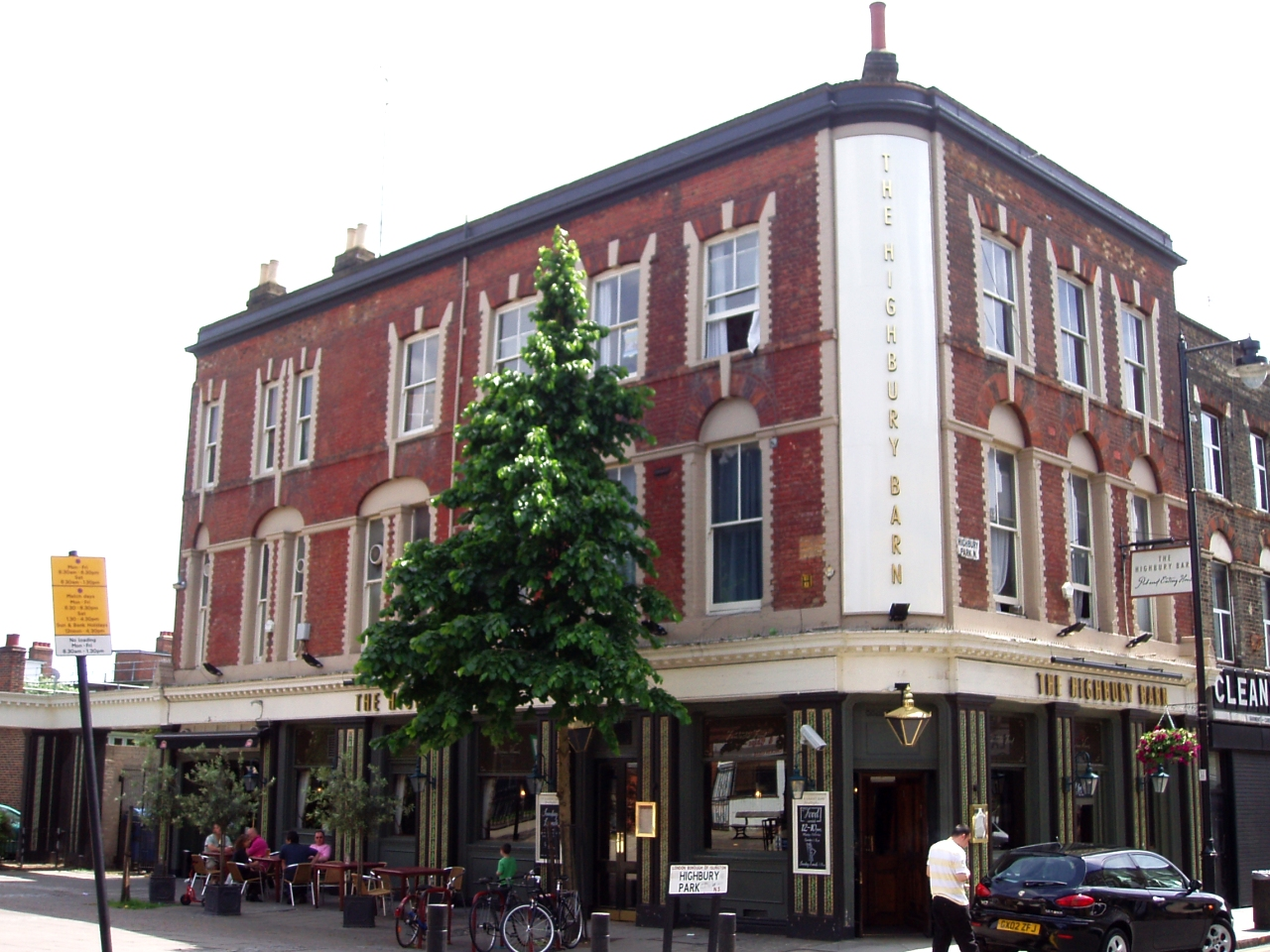
The Highbury Barn public house.

Highbury Park is a street in Highbury, London, that runs from Blackstock Road in the north to Highbury Grove in the south.

== Buildings ==
The late nineteenth century Highbury Barn public house refers in its name to the 18th century tea gardens that became a "pleasure resort" in the nineteenth century.

== See also ==
- Highbury New Park
