= Brain Cell Repulsion =

Mail art project

Brain Cell Repulsion is a mail art project begun by Ryosuke Cohen in June 1985. The project is a networked art project where individual artists contribute stamps, stickers, drawings or other images. These are sent through the mail to Cohen, who assembles and prints them as part of each cell. He prints 150 copies (30 x 42 cm) with a small silkscreen system called a Cyclostyle (now out of production). Each participant is mailed a Brain Cell print along with a documentation list of contributors worldwide.

Cohen keeps a copy for himself. Some of the remaining Brain Cell prints from each edition are assembled into sets of 30 consecutive editions. These set are sent to artists and Mail Art shows around the world.

Cohen also uses Brain Cell prints in the Fractal Portrait Project (another long running art series by Cohen) and as additions to Mail Art Add and Pass pages.

New Brain Cell editions are published every eight to ten days. More than nine hundred editions have been published.

Cohen described the origin of the project's name in 1985: "Well, I'll title my work 'Brain Cell', because the structure of a brain through a microscope looks like the diagram of the Mail Art network. Thousands of Neurons clung and piled up together are just like the Mail Art network, I believe."

Brain Cell is an art experiment in the vein of networked mail art, where a network expands from A, copied, forwarded and even returned to the originator. This produces a series of cybernetic cells, which can interact in a non-linear order. Brain Cell enlisted over 6,000 contributors from 80 nations between 1985 and 2002.

More than 1200 different Brain Cell prints have been created (Brain Cell nr 1232 was issued in January 2025).
