= Hectography =

Printing process that involves transfer of an original

- Woodblock printing: 200
- Movable type: 1040
- Intaglio (printmaking): 1430
- Printing press: c. 1440
- Etching: c. 1515
- Mezzotint: 1642
- Relief printing: 1690
- Aquatint: 1772
- Lithography: 1796
- Chromolithography: 1837
- Rotary press: 1843
- Hectograph: 1860
- Offset printing: 1875
- Hot metal typesetting: 1884
- Mimeograph: 1885
- Daisy wheel printing: 1889
- Photostat and rectigraph: 1907
- Screen printing: 1911
- Spirit duplicator: 1923
- Dot matrix printing: 1925
- Xerography: 1938
- Spark printing: 1940
- Phototypesetting: 1949
- Inkjet printing: 1950
- Dye-sublimation: 1957
- Laser printing: 1969
- Thermal printing: c. 1972
- Solid ink printing: 1972
- Thermal-transfer printing: 1981
- 3D printing: 1986
- Digital printing: 1991

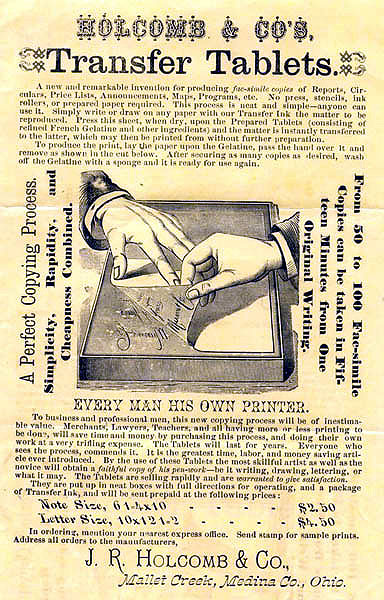
A 19th-century hectograph advertisement

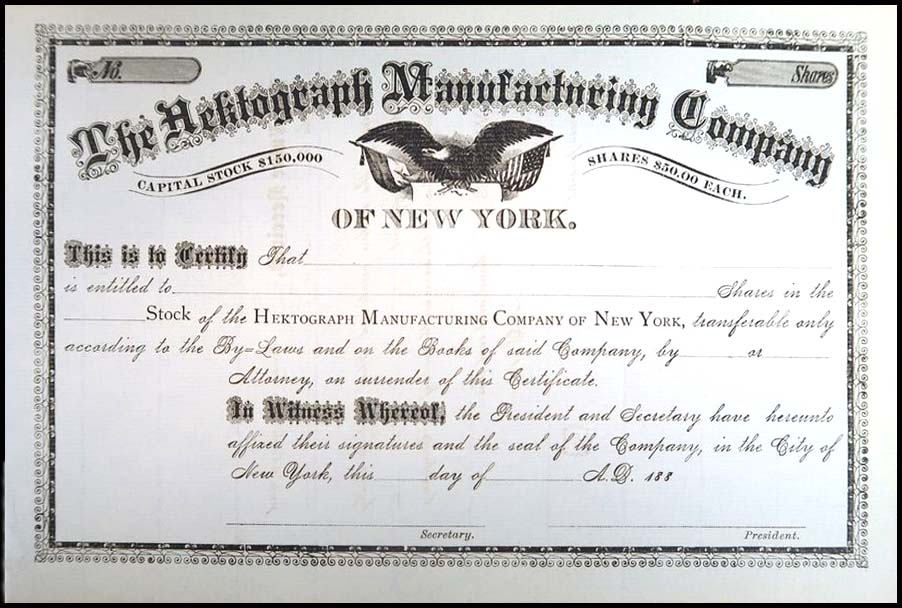
Unissued stock certificate of the Hektograph Manufacturing Company of New York, 1880s

Hectography is a printing process that involves transfer of an original, prepared with special inks, to a pan of gelatin or a gelatin pad pulled tight on a metal frame. A machine employing this process is a hectograph, also known as a gelatin duplicator or jellygraph.

== Process ==
The special aniline dyes for making the master image came in the form of ink or in pens, pencils, carbon paper, and typewriter ribbon. Hectograph pencils and pens are sometimes still available. Various other inks have been found usable to varying degrees in the process; master sheets for spirit duplicators have also been pressed into service. Unlike a spirit duplicator master, a hectograph master is not a mirror image. Thus, when using a spirit duplicator master with a hectograph, one writes on the back of the purple sheet, using it like carbon paper to produce an image on the white sheet, rather than writing on the front of the white sheet to produce a mirror image on its back.

The master is placed on the gelatin and spirits applied to transfer the ink from the master to the gelatin. After transfer of the image to the inked gelatin surface, copies are made by pressing paper against it.

When a pad ceased to be useful, the gelatin could be soaked with spirits, the ink sponged away, and the pad left clean for the next master.

=== Storage ===
A grey-colored, thick, absorbent paper pad was supplied to cover the gelatin surface for storage. This also removed ink from the surface, but it took many hours to do so. Care needed to be taken that the gelatin surface was kept clean, and not damaged (e.g. by fingernails) during duplicating.

Although the name hectograph implies production of 100 copies, in reality the gelatin process produced print runs of somewhere between 20 and 80 copies, depending upon the skill of the user and the quality of the original. At least eight different colors of hectographic ink were available at one time, but purple was the most popular because of its density and contrast.

== Historical uses ==
Siege of Khartoum notes (1884)
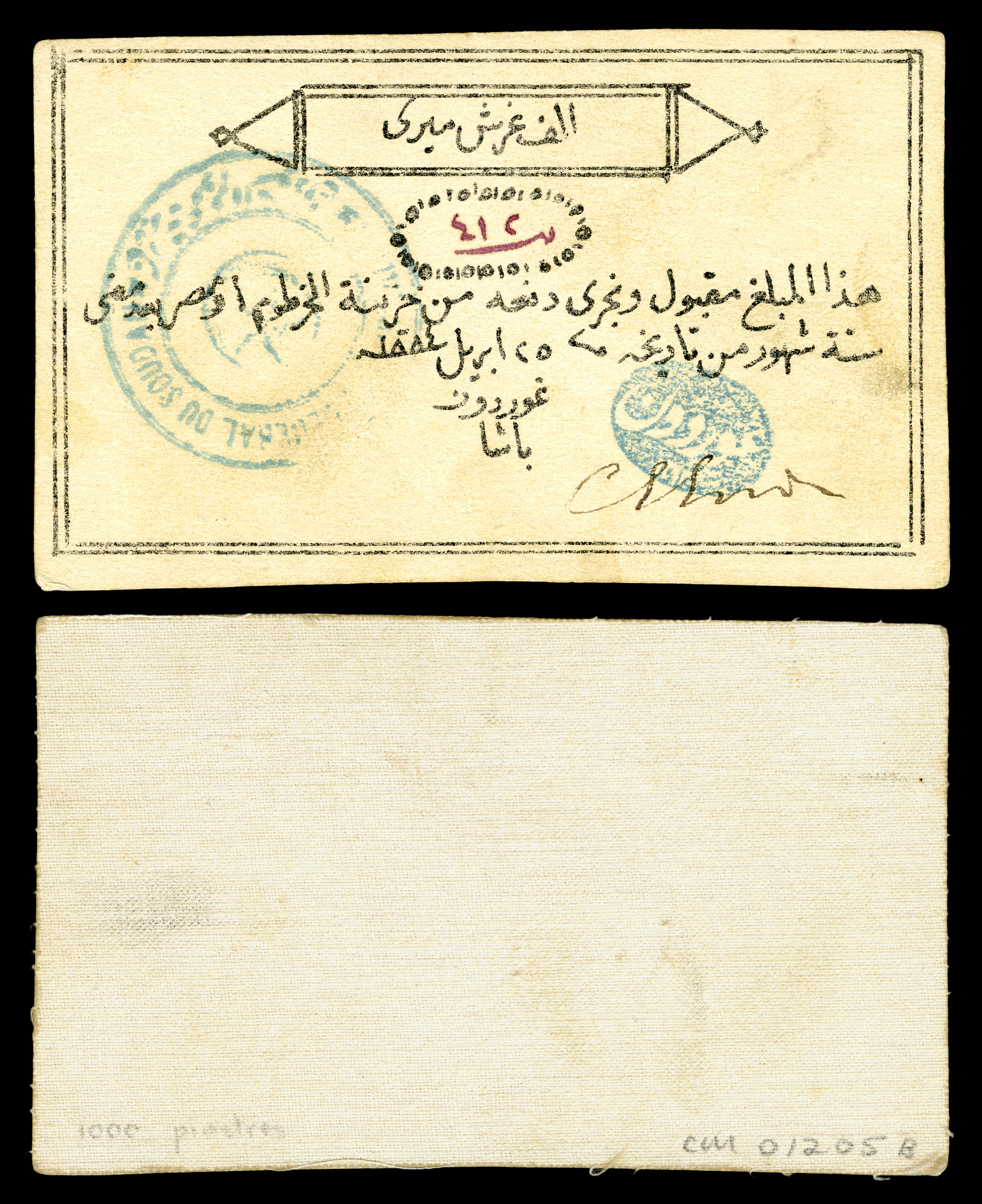
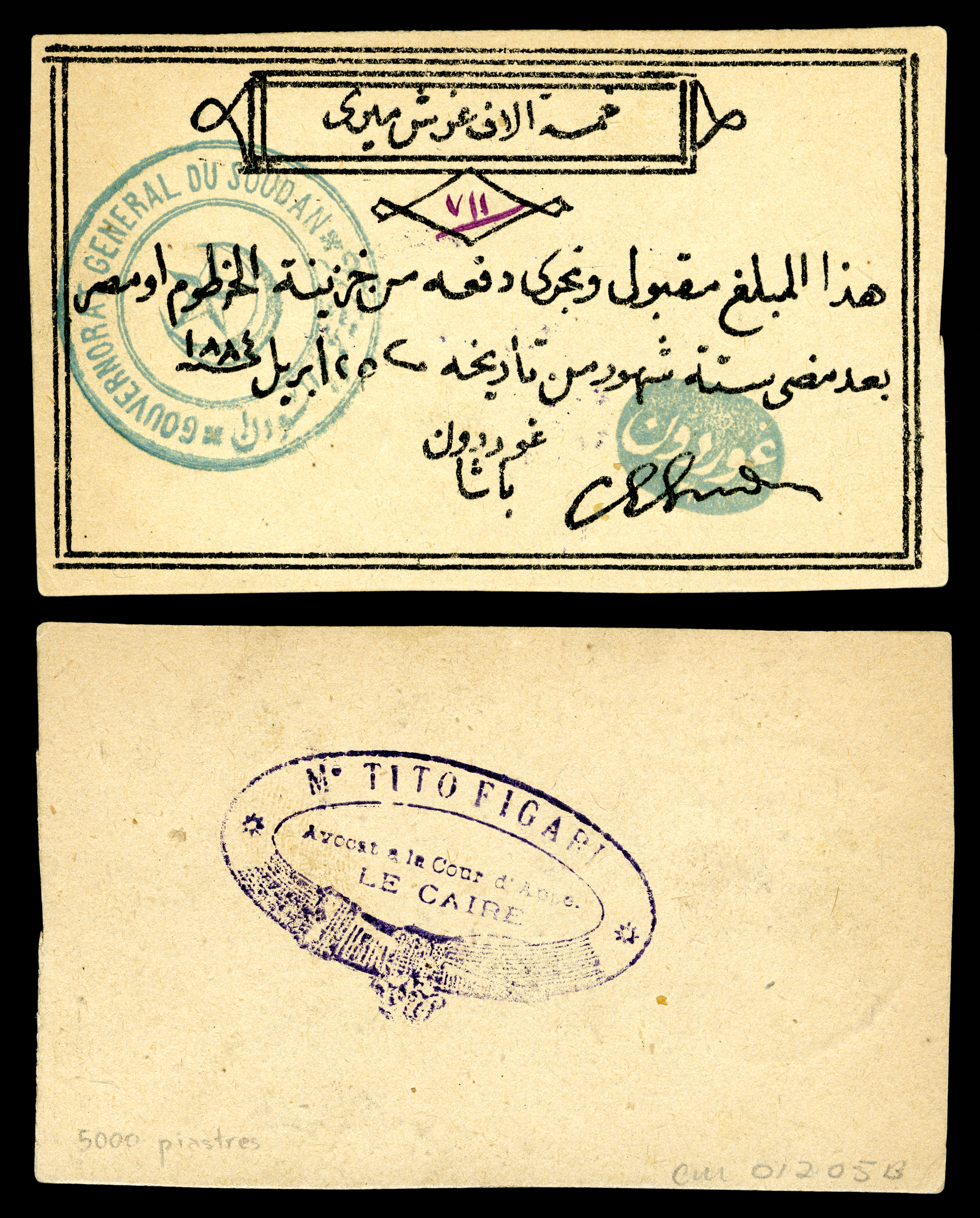
Siege of Khartoum promissory notes
issued and hand-signed by
Gen. Charles George Gordon (1884).
The top note is hand-signed; the bottom note
uses a hectographic signature.

Hectography dates from the 1860s.

The process, requiring limited technology and leaving few traces behind, has proven useful both in low-technology environments and in clandestine circumstances where discretion is necessary. In the early 20th century the process lent itself to small runs of school-classroom test papers, church newsletters and science-fiction fanzines. Prisoners of war at Stalag Luft III (the scene of The Great Escape) and at Colditz Castle during World War II used an improvised hectograph to reproduce documents for a planned escape attempt.

The Communist authorities in the Jiangsu–Anhui Border Area of China used the process for postage stamps in November 1948, produced in sheets of 35, with thirteen $50 values, six $100, twelve $200, two $300 and two $500 values.

Hectography has also served, though not very extensively, as an artistic medium in printmaking. The Russian Futurists used it for book illustrations, and the German expressionist Emil Nolde made four hectographs.

Stephen King, in his book On Writing, recalls how he and his elder brother Dave used the process to create their newspaper, Dave's Rag.

Hectography also emerged in professional situations; in Macy's advertising department during the 1950s and 1960s, full-page newspaper-ad layouts were drawn with hectograph pencils and then duplicated on a hectograph to make file copies for future reference. Before the popularization of spirit duplicators and the mimeograph, there were mechanized hectography machines that used a drum rather than a simple flat tray of gelatin.

=== In fiction ===
In the final chapters of The Pothunters (1902) by P. G. Wodehouse, the major characters use a jellygraph to produce a school magazine at very short notice. Wodehouse assumes his reader knows exactly what a jellygraph is and alludes to its being unattractive: "This jelly business makes one beastly sticky. I think we'll keep to print in future."

George Orwell's Keep the Aspidistra Flying (1936) describes a somewhat more subversive schoolboy publication:

And at that moment, in the years just after the War, England was so full of revolutionary opinion that even the public schools were infected by it. The young, even those who had been too young to fight, were in a bad temper with their elders, as well they might be; practically everyone with any brains at all was for the moment a revolutionary. Meanwhile the old—those over sixty, say—were running in circles like hens, squawking about "subversive ideas". Gordon and his friends had quite an exciting time with their "subversive ideas". For a whole year they ran an unofficial monthly paper called the Bolshevik, duplicated with a jellygraph. It advocated Socialism, free love, the dismemberment of the British Empire, the abolition of the Army and Navy, and so on and so forth. It was great fun. Every intelligent boy of sixteen is a Socialist. At that age one does not see the hook sticking out of the rather stodgy bait.

== See also ==
- Spirit duplicator
- Duplicating machines
- List of duplicating processes
