= Electrofax =

Type of fax

An electrofax was a type of fax. It involved electrostatic printer and copier technology, where an image was formed directly on the paper, instead of first on a drum, then transferred to paper, as it would be in xerography. It was used in the United States from the 1950s through the 1980s.

The paper used in this process was coated with a zinc oxide powder, adhered with a resin, to make it able to hold an electrostatic charge, and absorb toner, to form an image and allow the evaporation of toner dispersants. Users of electrofax machines purchased paper with the coating already applied.

Copiers typically feed paper from a roll, where it is given a static electric charge, after which it is exposed to light reflected from the original document, and focused through a lens; zinc oxide particles either preserve or discharge the electric charge, depending on the amount of light reaching them. After exposure, the paper is passed through a toner station: toner is typically carbon black suspended in an organic liquid known as a dispersant, then spread over the paper. Black toner particles adhere to areas on the paper that remain charged; discharged areas do not attract toner particles. A knife then cuts the paper to the proper length (typically letter or legal size). The subsequently independent sheet of paper then passes from the toner station, where excess dispersant is wiped off. Typically, the paper is finally sent to an output tray where any remaining dispersant evaporates, leaving copies with a faint "kerosene" odor.

In printers and plotters, paper is typically electrostatically charged by passing it over a bar containing hundreds or thousands of charging contacts. As paper passes over it, an image is formed by either applying or removing a charge from each individual contact. The result is a grid of charged dots on the paper. Toner is then applied as described above.

In the early 1950s, this technology was first developed at RCA (Radio Corporation of America). Subsequently, many office machine companies, including SCM (Smith Corona Marchant), Savin, etc., introduced copiers that utilized this technology. Versatec was a brand of computer printers and plotters using this process; electrostatic printers like the Versatec were important stepping-stones to later laser printers. Programs like vtroff, by Tom Ferrin at UCSF, consequently justified early more expensive laser printers.

Copying machines using electrofax technology were common from the 1960s through the 1980s. They were less expensive to manufacture than xerographic copiers, although the paper was slightly more costly than the plain paper used by xerography. Electrofax fell out of favor when other copier technologies could produce markedly better quality copies at less expense. By comparison, electrofax suffered a number of drawbacks, including: weak blacks in the image (most machines could only produce a dark gray), dampness and odor of the copies, the need for special paper, and multiple-bottle liquid toner replacement. Similarly, the need for electrofax based printers & plotters faded, as laser printers became cheaper, followed by inkjet printers.

== See also ==
- List of duplicating processes
