= Cyclostyle (copier) =

Duplicating process

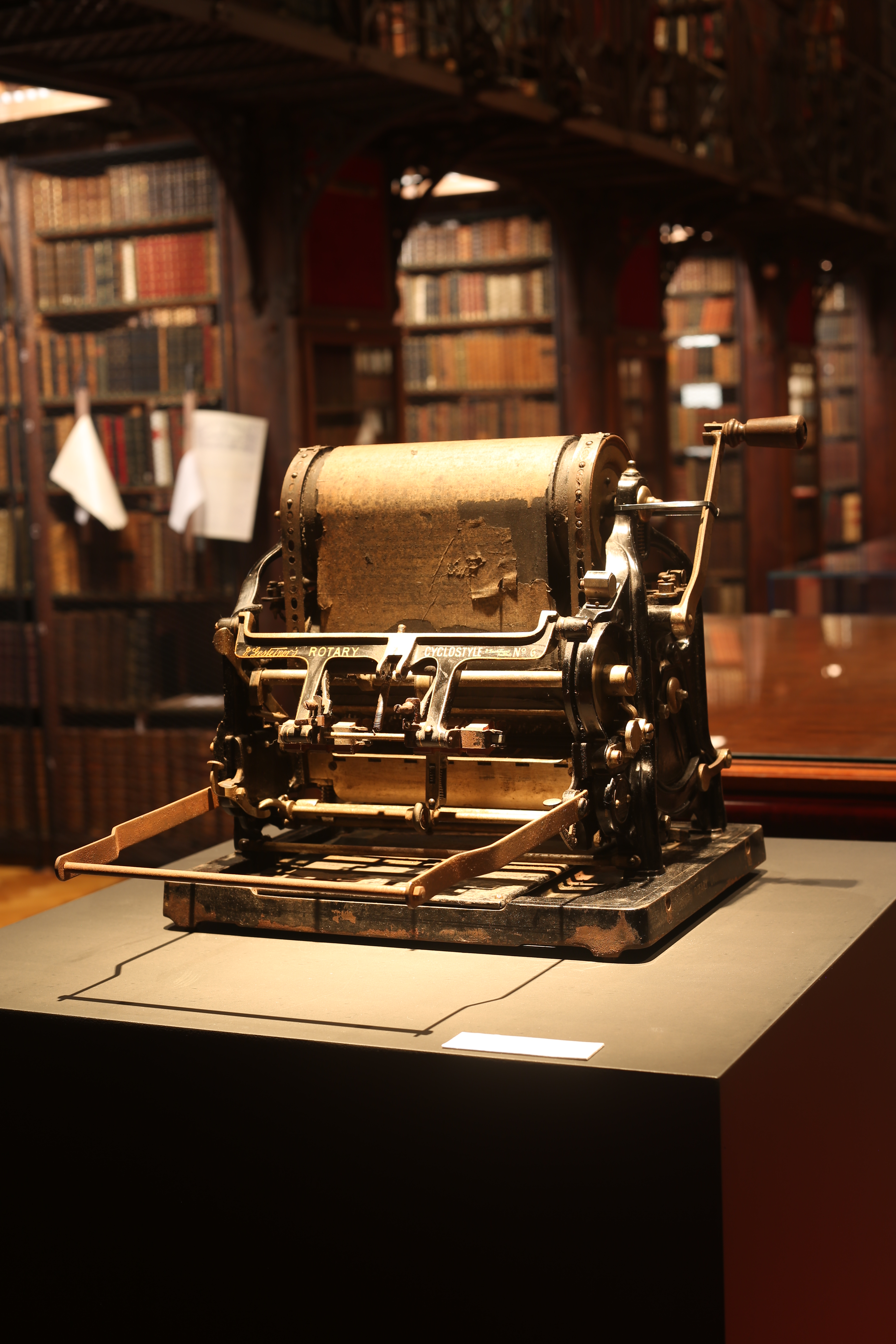
A Rotary Cyclostyle No. 6 duplicating press.

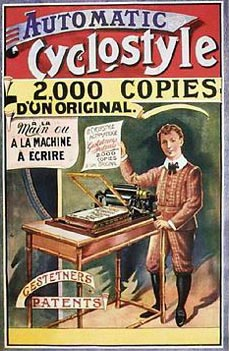
French advertisement for the Gestetner Cyclostyle, circa 1900

The Cyclostyle duplicating process is a form of stencil copying. A stencil is cut on wax or glazed paper by using a pen-like object with a small rowel or spur-wheel on its tip. A large number of small short lines are cut out in the glazed paper, removing the glaze with the spur-wheel, then ink is applied. It was invented in the later 19th century by David Gestetner, who named it cyclostyle after a drawing tool he used. Its name incorporates stylus, Classical Latin for a pen.

In year 1893 Francis Galton gave the following brief description of a cyclostyle:

The cyclostyle, which is an instrument used for multiple writing, makes about 140 dots to the inch. The style has a minute spur-wheel or roller, instead of a [pen] point; the writing is made on stencil paper, whose surface is covered with a brittle glaze. This is perforated by the teeth of the spur-wheel wherever they press against it. The half perforated sheet is then laid on writing paper, and an inked roller is worked over the glaze. The ink passes through the perforations and soaks through them on to the paper below; consequently the impression consists entirely of short and irregular cross bars or dots.

In 1875 Thomas Edison received a patent for the electric pen, which a decade later was superseded by the mimeograph machine. The cyclostyle was a more automated type of mimeograph machine that produced reproductions faster.

In 1893 Francis Galton described a system for sending line drawings through the widely established telegraph system, using simple numeric codes, and printing out the line drawings at the other end from the codes. He referred to this printer as a "Cyclostyle". It contained elements of Gestetner's system, and also elements in common with modern computer graphics printing of line drawings.

Nowadays, since 1985, the Cyclostyle is used by Japanese mail artist Ryosuke Cohen for his Brain Cell mail art project.

== See also ==
- Gestetner
