= Photocopier =

Device for reproducing documents

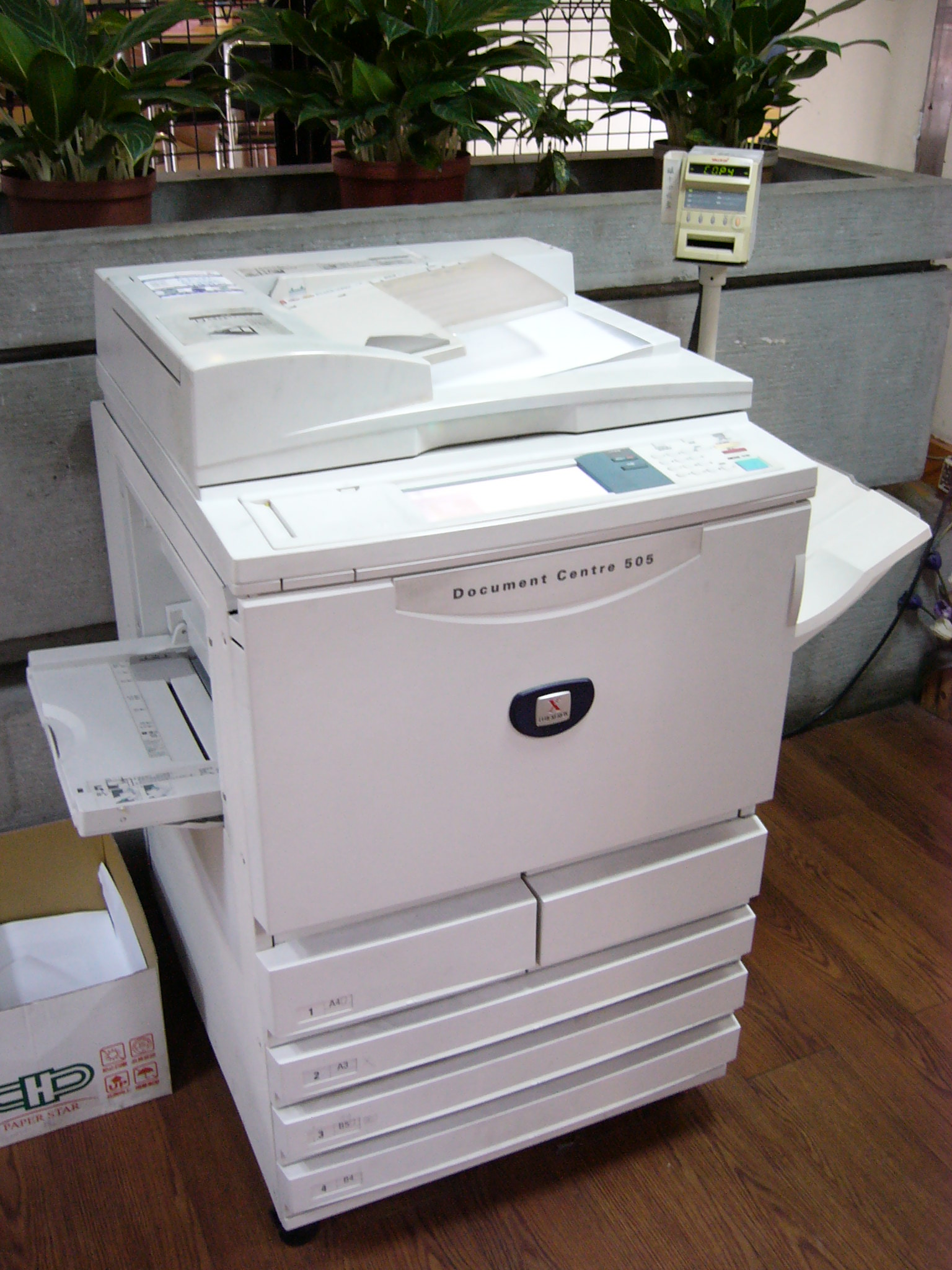
A Xerox digital photocopier in 2010

A photocopier (also called copier or copy machine, and formerly Xerox machine, the generic trademark) is a machine that makes copies of documents and other visual images onto paper or plastic film quickly and cheaply. Most modern photocopiers use a technology called xerography, a dry process that uses electrostatic charges on a light-sensitive photoreceptor to first attract and then transfer toner particles (a powder) onto paper in the form of an image. The toner is then fused onto the paper using heat, pressure, or a combination of both. Copiers can also use other technologies, such as inkjet, but xerography is standard for office copying.

Commercial xerographic office photocopying gradually replaced copies made by verifax, photostat, carbon paper, mimeograph machines, and other duplicating machines.

Photocopying is widely used in the business, education, and government sectors. While there have been predictions that photocopiers will eventually become obsolete as information workers increase their use of digital document creation, storage, and distribution and rely less on distributing actual pieces of paper, as of 2015, photocopiers continue to be widely used. During the 1980s, a convergence began in some high-end machines towards what came to be called a multi-function printer: a device that combined the roles of a photocopier, a fax machine, a scanner, and a computer network-connected printer. Low-end machines that can copy and print in color have increasingly dominated the home-office market as their prices fell steadily during the 1990s. High-end color photocopiers capable of heavy-duty handling cycles and large-format printing remain a costly option found primarily in print and design shops.

== History ==
Chester Carlson (1906–1968), the inventor of photocopying, was originally a patent attorney, as well as a part-time researcher and inventor. His job at the patent office in New York required him to make a large number of copies of important papers. Carlson, who was arthritic, found this a painful and tedious process. This motivated him to conduct experiments with photoconductivity. Carlson used his kitchen for his "electrophotography" experiments, and, in 1938, he applied for a patent for the process. He made the first photocopy using a zinc plate covered with sulfur. The words "10-22-38 Astoria" were written on a microscope slide, which was placed on top of more sulfur and under a bright light. After the slide was removed, a mirror image of the words remained. Carlson tried to sell his invention to some companies but failed because the process was still underdeveloped. At the time, multiple copies were most commonly made at the point of document origination, using carbon paper or manual duplicating machines. People did not see the need for an electronic copier. Between 1939 and 1944, Carlson was turned down by over 20 companies, including IBM and General Electric—neither of which believed there was a significant market for copiers.

In 1944, the Battelle Memorial Institute, a non-profit organization in Columbus, Ohio, contracted with Carlson to refine his new process. Over the next five years, the institute conducted experiments to improve the process of electrophotography. In 1947, Haloid Corporation, a manufacturer of photographic paper, approached Battelle to obtain a license to develop and market a copying machine based on this technology.

Haloid felt that the word "electrophotography" was too complicated and did not have good recall value. After consulting a professor of classical language at Ohio State University, Haloid and Carlson changed the name of the process to xerography, a term, coined from Greek roots, that meant "dry writing." Haloid called the new copier machines "Xerox Machines" and, in 1948, the term Xerox was trademarked. Haloid eventually became Xerox Corporation in 1961.

In 1949, Xerox Corporation introduced the first xerographic copier, called the Model A. Seeing off computing-leader IBM in the office-copying market, Xerox became so successful that, in North America, photocopying came to be popularly known as "xeroxing". Xerox has actively fought to prevent Xerox from becoming a genericized trademark. While the word Xerox has appeared in some dictionaries as a synonym for photocopying, Xerox Corporation typically requests such entries be modified, and discourages use of the term Xerox in this way.

In the early 1950s, Radio Corporation of America (RCA) introduced a variation on the process called Electrofax, whereby images are formed directly on specially coated paper and rendered with a toner dispersed in a liquid.

During the 1960s and through the 1980s, Savin Corporation developed and sold a line of liquid-toner copiers that implemented a technology based on patents held by the company.

Before the widespread adoption of xerographic copiers, photo-direct copies produced by machines such as Kodak's Verifax (based on a 1947 patent) were used. A primary obstacle associated with the pre-xerographic copying technologies was the high cost of supplies: a Verifax print required supplies costing US$0.15 in 1969, while a Xerox print could be made for $0.03, including paper and labor. The coin-operated Photostat machines still found in some public libraries in the late 1960s made letter-size copies for $0.25 each, when the minimum wage for a US worker was $1.65 per hour; the Xerox machines that replaced them typically charged $0.10.

Xerographic-copier manufacturers took advantage of the high perceived value copying had in the 1960s and early 1970s and marketed "specially designed" paper for xerographic output. By the end of the 1970s, paper producers made xerographic "runability" one of the requirements for most of their office-paper brands.

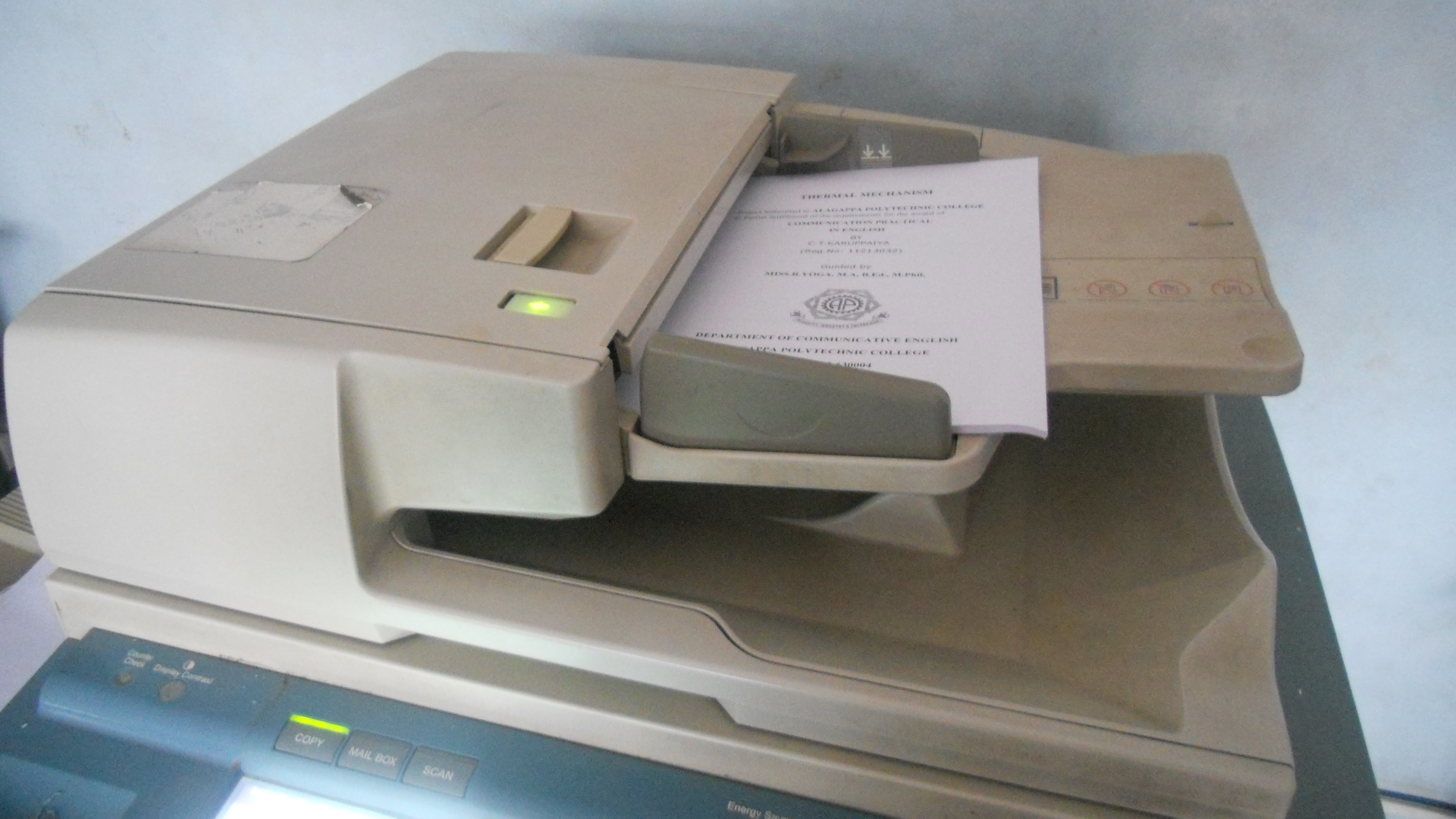
DADF or Duplex Automatic Document feeder - Canon IR6000

Some devices sold as photocopiers have replaced the drum-based process with inkjet or transfer-film technology.

Among the key advantages of photocopiers over earlier copying technologies is their ability:

- to use plain (untreated) office paper
- to implement duplex (two-sided) printing
- to scan several pages automatically with an ADF
- eventually, to sort and/or staple output

In 1970, Paul Orfalea founded Kinko's retail chain, in Isla Vista, California. Starting with a single copier that year, this copy service chain would expand to over 1,000 locations around the world. By the 1980s, Kinko's operated 24 hours a day, 7 days a week, with customers using the copy center for academic and business work as well as personal publishing and advertising. By the 1990s, Kinko's had 700 locations around the United States, with 5 in Manhattan. In such urban areas, Kinko's became a place where a multitude of users could make their ideas "typed, designed and xeroxed, then transmitted by fax, computer disk and Federal Express". Kate Eichhorn, in Adjusted Margin: Xerography, Art, and Activism in the Late Twentieth Century, notes that during this period (1970s through 1990s) the copy machine played "an especially notable role in the era's punk, street art, and DIY movements." FedEx purchased the Kinko's chain in 2004, and its services were incorporated into the name FedEx Office in 2008.

=== Color photocopiers ===
Colored toner became available in the 1940s, although full-color copiers were not commercially available until 1968, when 3M released the Color-in-Color copier, which used a dye sublimation process rather than conventional electrostatic technology. Xerox introduced the first electrostatic color-copier (the 6500) in 1973. Color photocopying is a concern to governments, as it facilitates counterfeiting currency and other documents: for more information, see § Counterfeiting.

=== Digital technology ===
There is an increasing trend for new photocopiers to implement digital technology, thereby replacing the older analog technology. With digital copying, the copier effectively consists of an integrated scanner and laser printer. This design has several advantages, such as automatic image-quality enhancement and the ability to "build jobs" (that is, to scan page images independently of printing them). Some digital copiers can function as high-speed scanners; such models typically offer the ability to send documents via email or make them available on file servers.

A significant advantage of digital copier technology is "automatic digital collation". For example, when copying a set of 20 pages 20 times, a digital copier scans each page only once, then uses the stored information to produce 20 sets. In an analog copier, either each page is scanned 20 times (a total of 400 scans), making one set at a time, or 20 separate output trays are used for the 20 sets.

Low-end copiers also use digital technology, but tend to consist of a standard PC scanner coupled to an inkjet or low-end laser printer, which are far slower than their counterparts in high-end copiers. However, low-end scanner-inkjets can provide color copying at a lower upfront purchase-price but a much higher cost per copy. Combined digital scanner/printers sometimes have built-in fax machines and can be classified as one type of multifunction printer.

== How it works (using xerography) ==
Schematic overview of the xerographic photocopying process (step 1–4)

1. Charging: cylindrical drum is electrostatically charged by a high voltage wire called a corona wire or a charge roller. The drum has a coating of a photoconductive material. A photoconductor is a semiconductor that becomes conductive when exposed to light.
2. Exposure: A bright lamp illuminates the original document, and the white areas of the original document reflect the light onto the surface of the photoconductive drum. The drum areas that are exposed to light become conductive and therefore discharge to the ground. The drum area not exposed to light (those areas that correspond to black portions of the original document) remains negatively charged.
3. Developing: The toner is positively charged. When it is applied to the drum to develop the image, it is attracted and sticks to the negatively charged areas (black areas), just as paper sticks to a balloon with a static charge.
4. Transfer: The resulting toner image on the surface of the drum is transferred from the drum onto a piece of paper that has an even greater negative charge than the drum has.
5. Fusing: The toner is melted and bonded to the paper by heat and pressure rollers.

A negative photocopy inverts the document's colors when creating a photocopy, resulting in letters that appear white on a black background instead of black on a white background. Negative photocopies of old or faded documents sometimes produce documents that have better focus and are easier to read and study.

== Copyright issues ==
Photocopying material that is subject to copyright (such as books or scientific papers) is subject to restrictions in most countries. This is common practice, as the cost of purchasing a book for the sake of one article or a few pages can be excessive. The principle of fair use (in the United States) or fair dealing (in other Berne Convention countries) allows copying for certain specified purposes.

In certain countries, such as Canada, some universities pay royalties from each photocopy made at university copy machines and copy centers to copyright collectives out of the revenues from the photocopying, and these collectives distribute resulting funds to various scholarly publishers. In the United States, photocopied compilations of articles, handouts, graphics, and other information called readers often require texts for college classes. Either the instructor or the copy center is responsible for clearing copyright for every article in the reader, and attribution information must be clearly included in the reader.

== Counterfeiting ==
To counter the risk of people using color copiers to create counterfeit copies of paper currency, some countries have incorporated anti-counterfeiting technologies into their currency. These include watermarks, microprinting, holograms, tiny security strips made of plastic (or other material), and ink that appears to change color as the currency is viewed at an angle. Some photocopying machines contain special software that can prevent copying currency that has a special pattern.

Color copying also raises concerns regarding the copying and/or forging of other documents, such as driver's licenses and university degrees and transcripts. Some driver's licenses are made with embedded holograms so that a police officer can detect a fake copy. Some university and college transcripts have special anti-copying watermarks in the background. If a copy is made, the watermarks will become highly visible, which allows the recipient to determine that they have a copy rather than a genuine original transcript.

== Health issues ==
Exposure to ultraviolet light is a concern. In the early days of photocopiers, the sensitizing light source was filtered green to match the optimal sensitivity of the photoconductive surface. This filtering conveniently removed all ultraviolet. Currently, a variety of light sources are used. As glass transmits ultraviolet rays between 325 and 400 nanometers, copiers with ultraviolet-producing lights such as fluorescent, tungsten halogen, or xenon flash, expose documents to some ultraviolet.

Concerns about emissions from photocopy machines have been expressed by some in connection with the use of selenium and emissions of ozone and fumes from heated toner.

== Forensic identification ==
Similar to forensic identification of typewriters, computer printers and copiers can be traced by imperfections in their output. The mechanical tolerances of the toner and paper feed mechanisms cause banding, which can reveal information about the individual device's mechanical properties. It is often possible to identify the manufacturer and brand, and, in some cases, the individual printer can be identified from a set of known printers by comparing their outputs.

Some high-quality color printers and copiers steganographically embed their identification code into the printed pages, as fine and almost invisible patterns of yellow dots. Some sources identify Xerox and Canon as companies doing this. The Electronic Frontier Foundation (EFF) has investigated this issue and documented how the Xerox DocuColor printer's serial number, as well as the date and time of the printout, are encoded in a repeating 8×15 dot pattern in the yellow channel. EFF is working to reverse engineer additional printers. The EFF also reports that the US government has asked these companies to implement such a tracking scheme, so that counterfeiting can be traced. The EFF has filed a Freedom of Information Act request in order to look into privacy implications of this tracking.

== Wet photocopying ==
Photocopying, using liquid developer, was developed by Ken Metcalfe and Bob Wright of Defence Standards Laboratory in Adelaide in 1952.

Photocopying, using liquid developer, was used in 1967.

Images from 'wet photocopying' do not last as long as dry toner images, but this is not due to acidity.

== See also ==
- Gestetner
- Heliography
- IBM Copier Family
- List of duplicating processes
- Print Audit
- Reprography
- Risograph
- Scanography
- Thermochromatic ink
- Thermofax
- Xerox art
- Xerox 914
