= Photostat machine =

Projection photocopier

The Photostat machine, or Photostat, was an early projection photocopier created in the decade of the 1900s by the Commercial Camera Company, which became the Photostat Corporation. The "Photostat" name, which was originally a trademark of the company, became genericized, and was often used to refer to similar machines produced by the RetinalGraph Company or to any copy made by any such machine.

== History ==
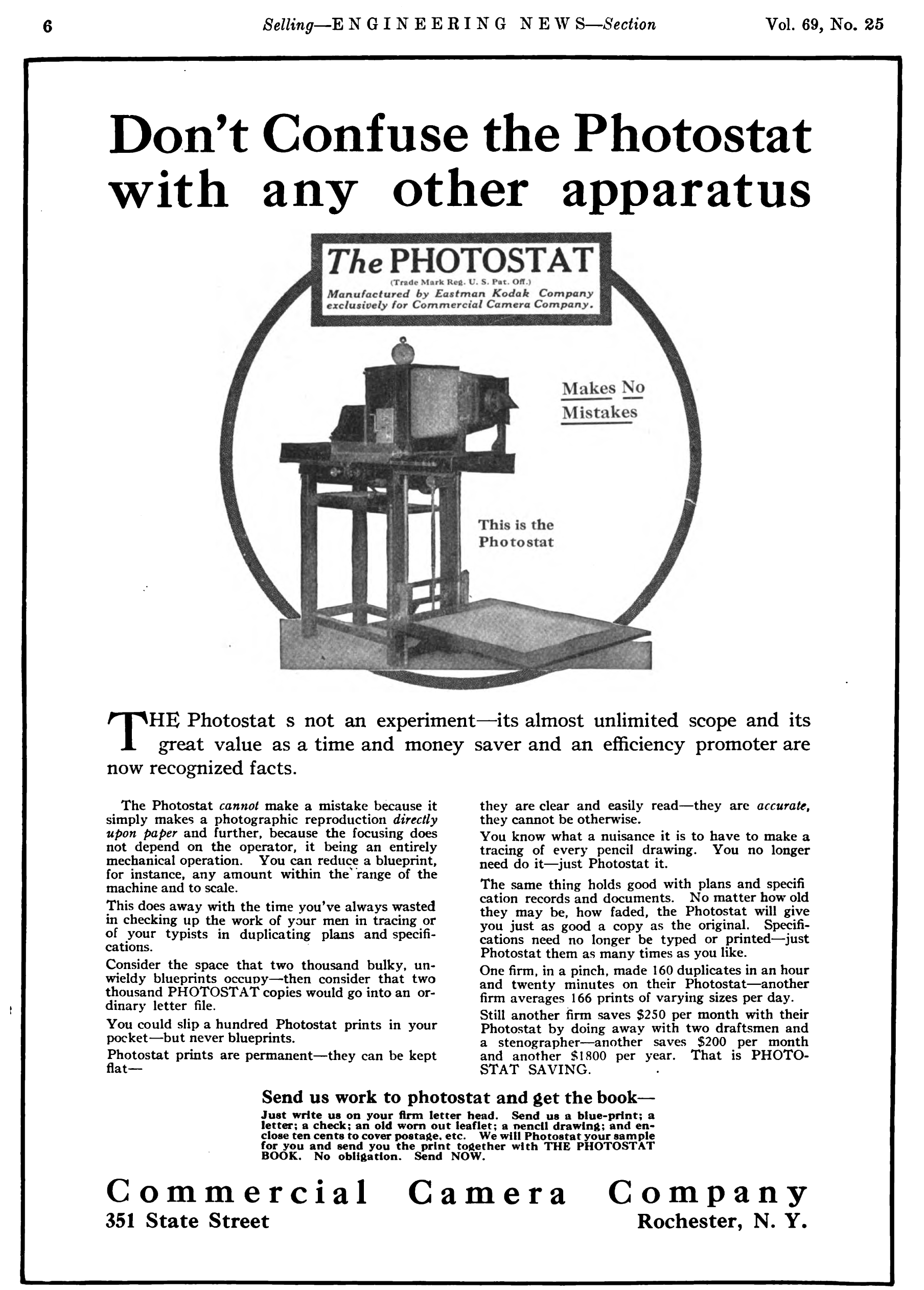
Commercial Camera Company Photostat advertisement in Engineering News, 1913.

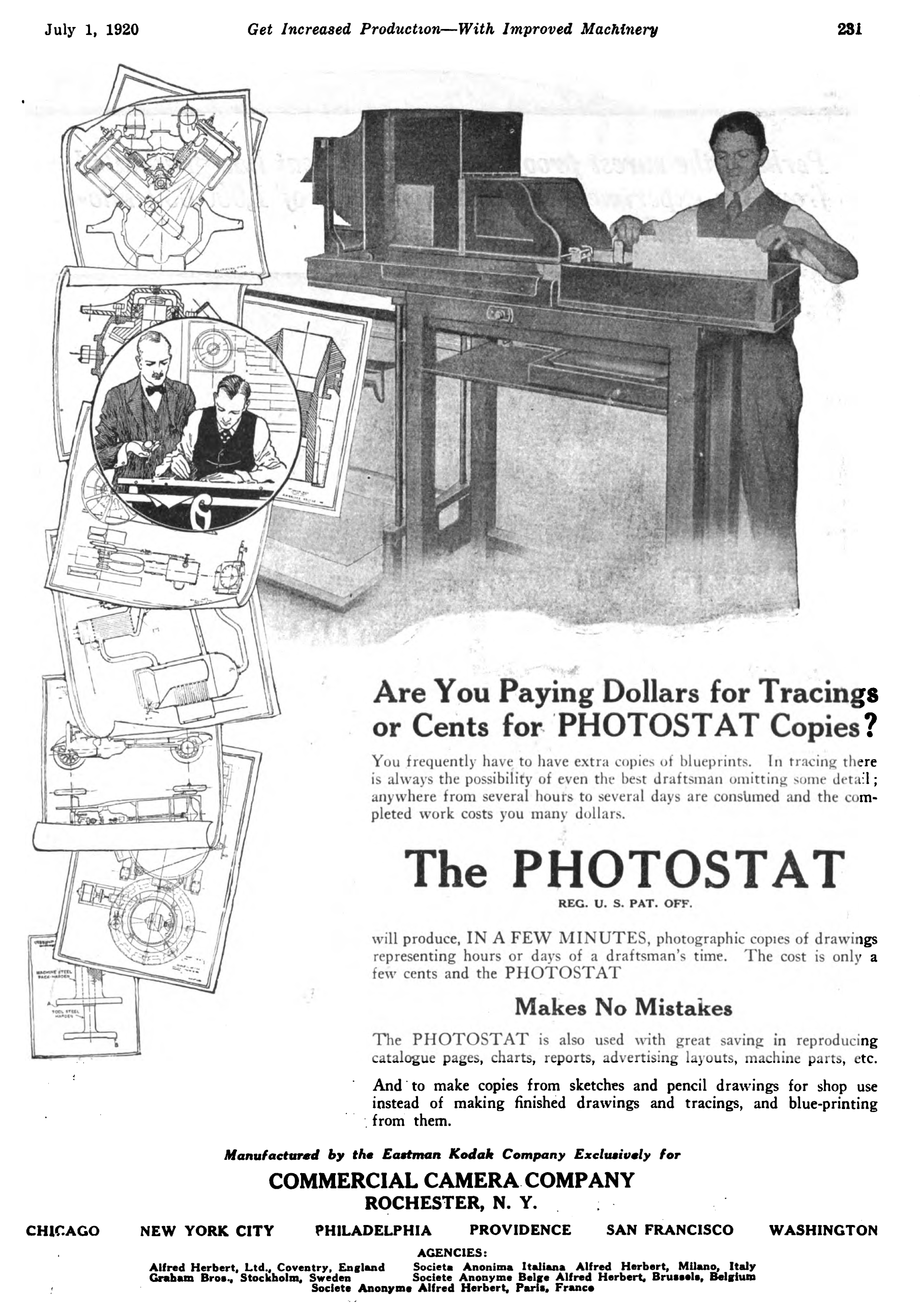
Commercial Camera Company Photostat advertisement in American Machinist, 1920.

=== Background ===
The growth of business during the Industrial Revolution created the need for a more efficient means of transcription than hand copying. Carbon paper was first used in the early 19th century. By the late 1840s copying presses were used to copy outgoing correspondence. One by one, other methods appeared. These included the "manifold writer", developed from Christoph Scheiner's pantograph and used by Mark Twain; copying baths; copying books; and roller copiers. Among the most significant of them was the Blue process in the early 1870s, which was mainly used to make blueprints of architectural and engineering drawings. Stencil duplicators (more commonly known as "Mimeograph machines") surfaced in 1874, and the Cyclostyle in 1891. All were manual and most involved messy fluids.

=== Retinal and Photostat machines ===
George C. Beidler of Oklahoma City founded the RetinalGraph Company in 1906 or 1907, producing the first photographic copying machines; he later moved the company to Rochester, New York in 1909 to be closer to the Haloid Company, his main source of photographic paper and chemicals.

The RetinalGraph Company was acquired by the Haloid Company in 1935. In 1948, Haloid purchased the rights to produce Chester Carlson's xerographic equipment and in 1958 the firm was reorganized to Haloid Xerox, Inc., which in 1961 was renamed Xerox Corporation. Haloid continued selling RetinalGraph machines into the 1960s.

The Photostat brand machine, differing in operation from the RetinalGraph but with the same purpose of the photographic copying of documents, was invented in Kansas City by Oscar T. Gregory in 1907. A directory of the city from 1909 shows his "Gregory Commercial Camera Company". By 1910, Gregory had co-filed a patent application with Norman W. Carkhuff, of the photography department of the United States Geological Survey, for a specific type of photographic camera, for quickly and easily photographing small objects, with a further object "to provide a camera of the type known as 'copying cameras' that will be simple and convenient [...]" In 1911, the Commercial Camera Company of Providence, Rhode Island, was formed. By 1912, Photostat brand machines were in use, as evidenced by a record of one at the New York Public Library. By 1913, advertisements described the Commercial Camera Company as headquartered at Rochester and with a licensing and manufacturing relationship with Eastman Kodak. The pair filed another U.S. patent application in 1913 further developing their ideas. By 1920, distribution agency in various European markets was by the Alfred Herbert companies. The Commercial Camera Company apparently became the Photostat Corporation around 1921, for "Commercial Camera Company" is described as a former name of Photostat Corporation in a 1922 issue of Patent and Trade Mark Review. For at least 40 years the brand was widespread enough that its name was genericized by the public.

The Photostat Corporation was eventually absorbed by Itek in 1963.

== Description ==
Both RetinalGraph and Photostat machines consisted of a large camera that photographed documents or papers and exposed an image directly onto rolls of sensitized photographic paper that were about 350 feet (110 m) long. Since the camera lens inverted the image, a prism was placed in front of the lens to return the image to its original orientation. After a 10-second exposure, the paper was directed to developing and fixing baths, then either air- or machine-dried. Since the print was directly exposed, without the use of an intermediate film, the result was a negative print. A typical typewritten document would appear on the photostat print with a black background and white letters. Thanks to the prism, the text would remain legible. Producing photostats took about two minutes in total. The result could, in turn, be photostated again to make any number of positive prints.

The photographic prints produced by such machines are commonly referred to as "photostats" or "photostatic copies". The verbs "photostat", "photostatted", and "photostatting" refer to making copies on such a machine in the same way that the trademarked name "Xerox" was later used to refer to any copy made by means of electrostatic photocopying. People who operated these machines were known as photostat operators.

It was the expense and inconvenience of photostats that drove Chester Carlson to study electrophotography. In the mid-1940s Carlson sold the rights to his invention – which became known as xerography – to the Haloid Company and photostatting soon sank into history.

== See also ==
- Cyclostyle (copier)
- Duplicating machines
- List of duplicating processes
