= Ryosuke Cohen =

Japanese mail artist (born 1948)

Ryosuke Cohen (幸円 良介, Kōen Ryōsuke; born 1948 in Osaka, Japan) is a mail artist. He was responsible for the Brain Cell mail art project, which he began in June 1985 and retains thousands of members in more than 80 countries, e.g. Hans Braumüller, Theo Breuer, Michael Leigh or Litsa Spathi. In August 2001 he began the Fractal Portrait Project. He has taught art to school children for more than 25 years.

Cohen discovered mail art through the Canadian artist Byron Black. Early work by Cohen is a mixture of traditional Japanese imagery, contemporary icons, and numbers, as well as his signature, the letter "C".

In 1997 Guy Bleus organised a solo exhibition of Cohen's mail art work at the E-Mail Art Archives in the Centre for Visual Arts (now Z33) in Hasselt (Belgium).

Cohen's family name is conventionally romanized as Kōen, but on the advice of a friend, he adopted the English spelling 'Cohen'. He is not a Kohen.
