= Henry Rydon =

Henry Rydon (died January, 1885) was a London property developer active in the 1850s. He was originally a tailor based at Finsbury Circus. During the 1830 he became involved in land ownership developing a brickfield and acquiring land near where he lived in Highbury.

The Rydon Arms, a public house built in an area of Islington he was developing near Arlington Street and New North Road bears his name.
