= Tottenham Hale =

District of north London, England

Coordinates: 51.588°N 0.060°W

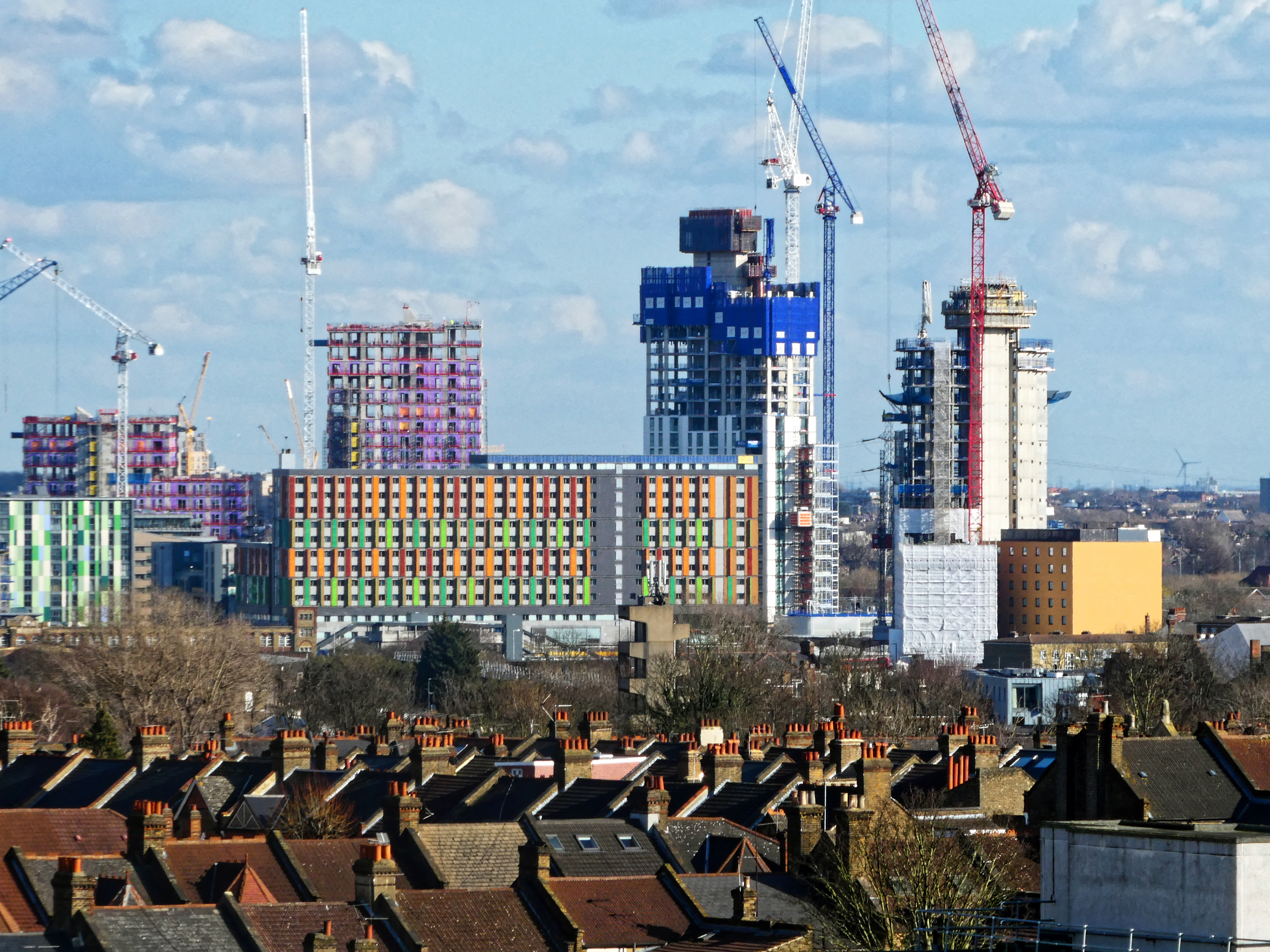
- Building construction at Tottenham Hale, March 2020

- Location within Greater London
- Population: 15,064 (2011 Census. Ward)
- OS grid reference: TQ345895
  - Charing Cross: 6.1 mi (9.8 km) SSW
- London borough: Haringey
- Ceremonial county: Greater London
- Region: London
- Country: England
- Sovereign state: United Kingdom
- Post town: LONDON
- Postcode district: N15, N17
- Dialling code: 020
- Police: Metropolitan
- Fire: London
- Ambulance: London
- UK Parliament: Tottenham
- London Assembly: Enfield and Haringey

Tottenham Hale is a district of north London and part of the London Borough of Haringey, bounded by the River Lea and located to the south/south-east of Tottenham proper. From 1850 to 1965, it was part of the Municipal Borough of Tottenham, in Middlesex.

The area is currently undergoing major regeneration.

== Etymology ==
Tottenham Hale takes its name from the old English word Hale (to hoist or pull), as goods (particularly timber) were unloaded from the River Lea for onward transport by road at this point.

== Character of the area ==
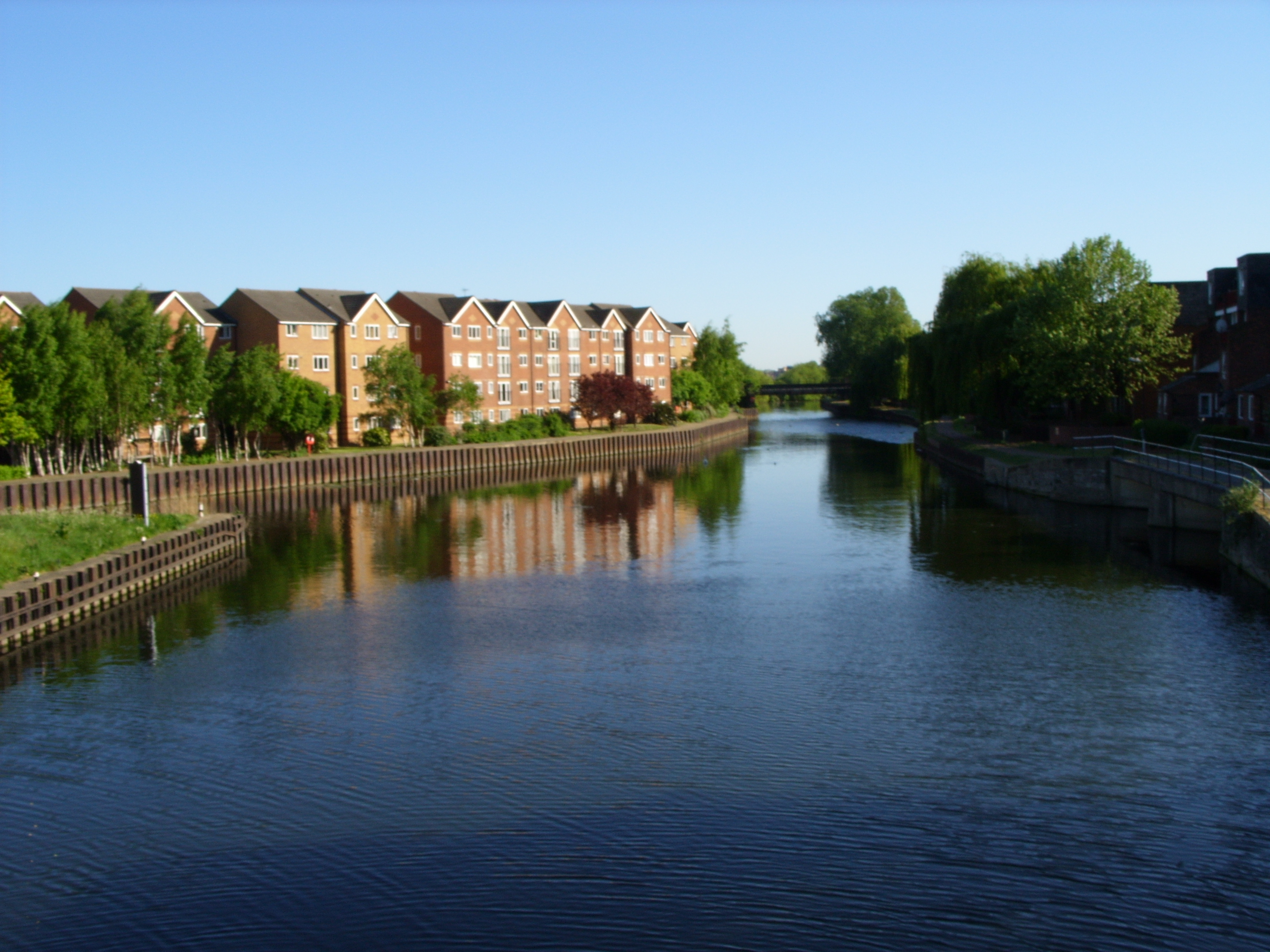
The River Lea as it flows through Tottenham Hale and past Heron Wharf.

Centred around Tottenham Hale station the area was formerly largely industrial in character with an emphasis on timber related products. The industrial sites have become large residential areas and a retail park. The retail park was looted and set alight in the 2011 England riots. Since then there have been a large-scale housing project constructed, and Haringey Council has formulated plans to redevelop the area.

The east of Tottenham Hale borders the London Borough of Waltham Forest and the Walthamstow Reservoirs including the Walthamstow Wetlands. The River Lea runs through the east of Tottenham Hale. This includes the Tottenham Lock and the Pymmes Brook merging with the river. Surrounding these are a series of residential areas: Hale Village, the Ferry Lane Estate, Heron Wharf and the under construction Hale Wharf development.

Hale Village's design is based on Hammarby Sjöstad in Stockholm, Sweden.

Tottenham Hale is currently part of a major regeneration programme, which includes £1 billion of development investment, backed by Haringey Council and the GLA.

== Demography ==
The district is represented by the Tottenham Hale ward in the London Borough of Haringey. In the 2011 census the ward counted a population of 17,300. The largest ethnic group (making up 22% of the population) was Whites not of British ancestry, followed by White British (18%), Black African (16%) and Black Caribbean (13%). The median age as of 2013 was 29 years. The life expectancy was 78.1 years for males and 84.0 years for females. The median house price as of 2014 was £251,500, compared to £326,500 in the Tottenham Green ward. A majority (54.4%) of homes in the ward were flats/apartments/maisonettes.

== Wildlife ==
The nearby Walthamstow Reservoirs and River Lea support a variety of waterfowl including herons, geese, swans, moorhens and coots.

The Walthamstow Reservoirs was awarded a Heritage Lottery grant, funding their development into Europe's largest Urban Wetland Park.

The Paddocks Nature Park provides a nesting site for birds such as song thrush, blackbird and various warblers. Weasels and hedgehogs as well as bats reside in the park.

== Economy ==
=== Tottenham Hale Retail Park ===
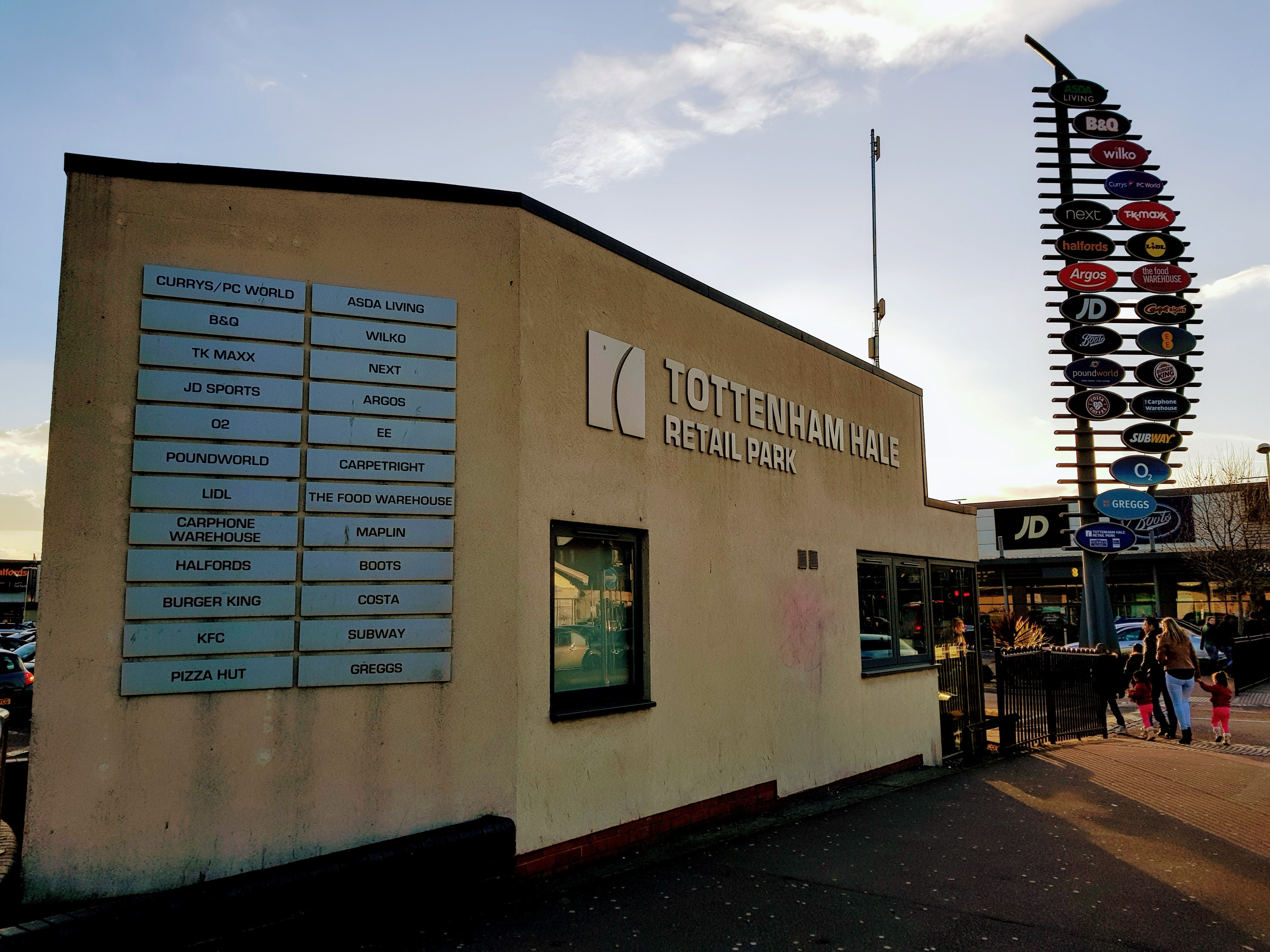
Entrance to the retail park

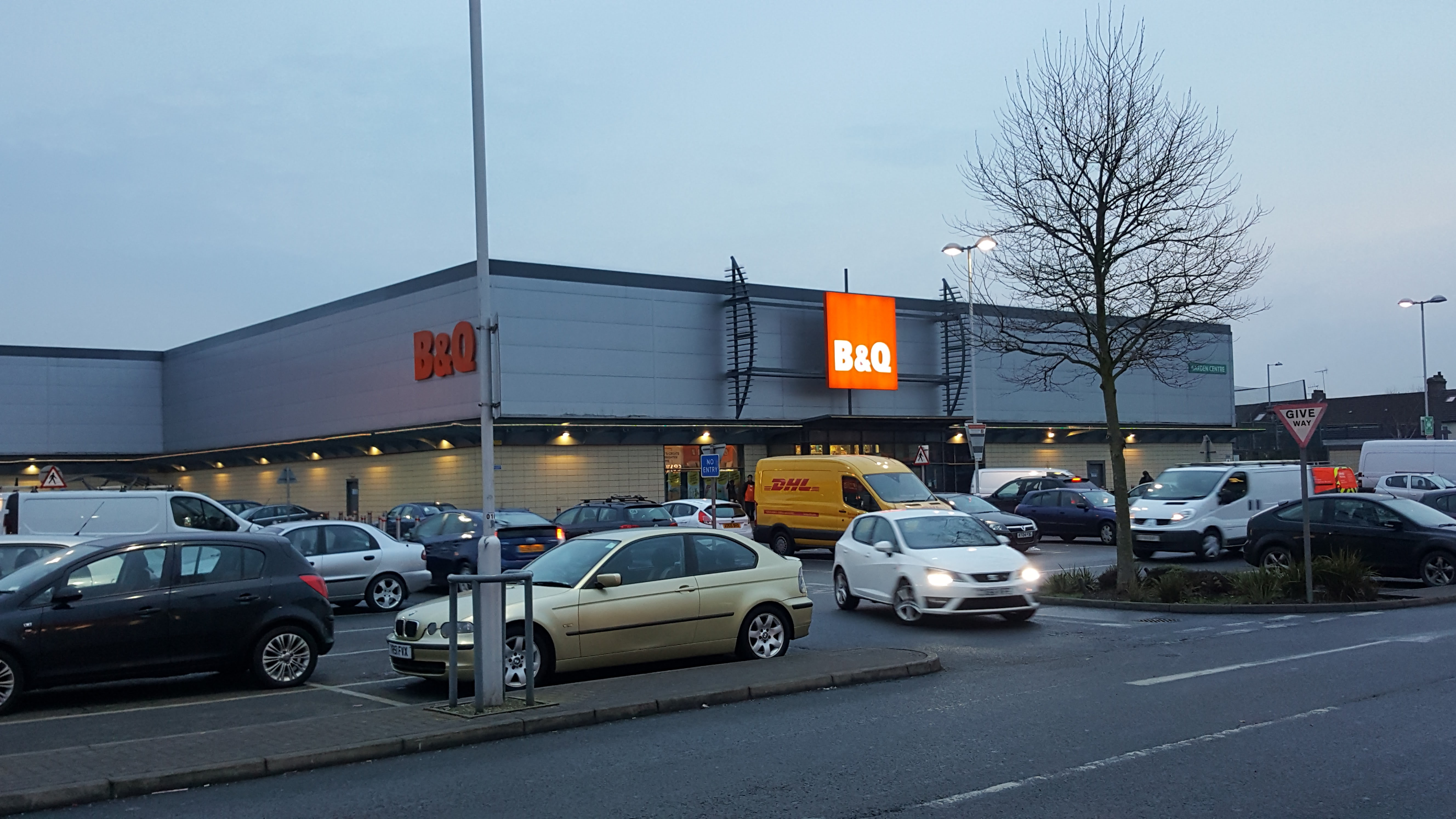
Inside the retail park

Tottenham Hale Retail Park is a major 22 acres (8.9 ha) retail park located adjacent to the local tube station on Ferry Lane. The site has a total retail space of 200,000 square feet, and is occupied by retailers including Adidas, TK Maxx, Curry's, Lidl, Iceland and Costa.

=== Industry ===
The following companies are or have been located in the Tottenham Hale area:

Name	Dates	Notes
Hale Motors/ The Ray Powell Group		Rootes/Chrysler Main Dealers, 1970s.
Cannon Automotive		Makers of rubber car mats etc.
Gestetner		It was formerly the location of the Gestetner duplicating machine factory, opened in 1906 and growing to be the largest duplicator manufacturer in the world, employing around 6,000 people until the 1970s.
Eagle Pencils (later Berol)	1910 to the 1990s	
John Dickinson & Co. Ltd.	1903	The envelope manufacturer Millington & Sons Ltd. (est. 1824) moved their main factory in Southwark and its subsidiary factory in Banner Street to a new premises in Crown Works, Tottenham. The company was the most powerful competitor of John Dickinson & Co. Ltd. until it was bought by Dickinson in 1918. Millington was run by John Dickinson & Co. as an independent subsidiary until 1931, when it was integrated the Dickinson organisation. The Basildon Bond brand of stationery was created by Millington and Sons in 1911.
English Abrasives		Abrasive papers etc.
Harris Lebus	1904 - 1969	At one time this was the largest furniture factory in Europe, employing 8,000 by the late 1930s. During the Second World War the factory produced parts for De Havilland Mosquito aircraft, the Airspeed Horsa attack glider and even false wooden copies of the Sherman tank. The factory featured a large network of air raid shelters, which survived until the site was redeveloped in 2008 for a local mixed-use development.
Greater London Council (GLC) Supplies Department		The site of the 29,000m^{2} warehouse of the former Greater London Council which provided a centralised purchasing function for the GLC, the Inner London Education Authority and some of the outer London boroughs. This warehouse was on the site of the former Harris Lebus factory on the north side of Ferry Lane and was redeveloped in 2008.
Bally Studios	1989	Rehearsal and Recording studio where Coldplay and Keane both recorded their first EP's when it was known as Sync City. Changed name in 2005, since used by Caribou, Bombay Bicycle Club, Rudimental and 800+ more bands.
Beavertown Brewery	2014	Craft Brewery
Pressure Drop	2017	Craft Brewery
Fifth Column Ltd	2014	T-shirt Printing

== Transport ==
Tottenham Hale station is on the Victoria line and also has National Rail Greater Anglia services. This includes the Stansted Express, the West Anglia Main Line and the Lea Valley Lines. The station is also part of the proposed Crossrail 2 project.

The redevelopment of Tottenham Hale bus station was completed in December 2014. The railway and Underground station was redeveloped and completed in April 2022. Work has begun on installing an extra National Rail track to increase the frequency of services.

The following bus routes serve the bus station: 41, 76, 123, 192, 230, W4, N41 and N73.

== Gallery ==
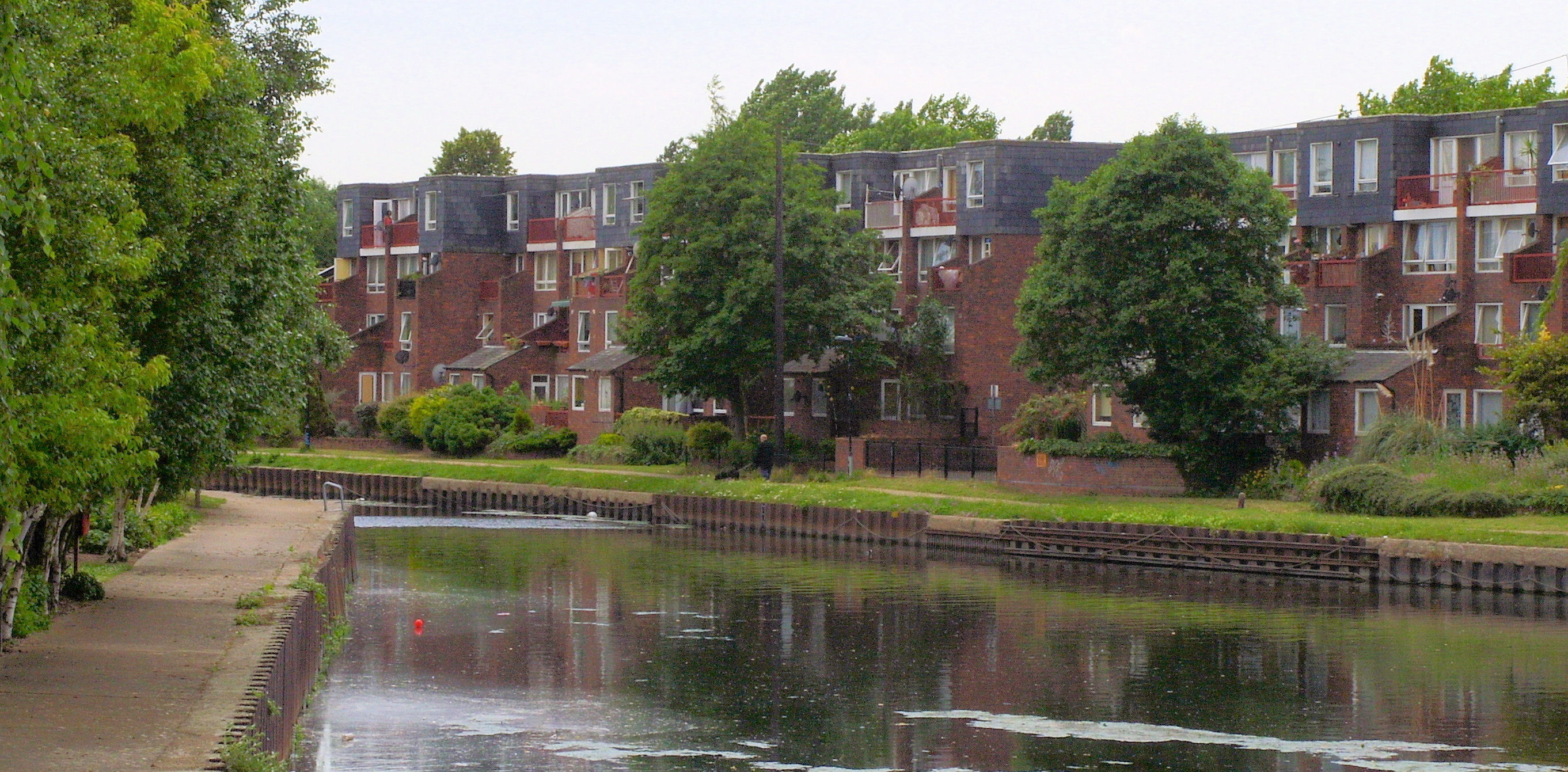
The River Lea passing the Ferry Lane Estate.

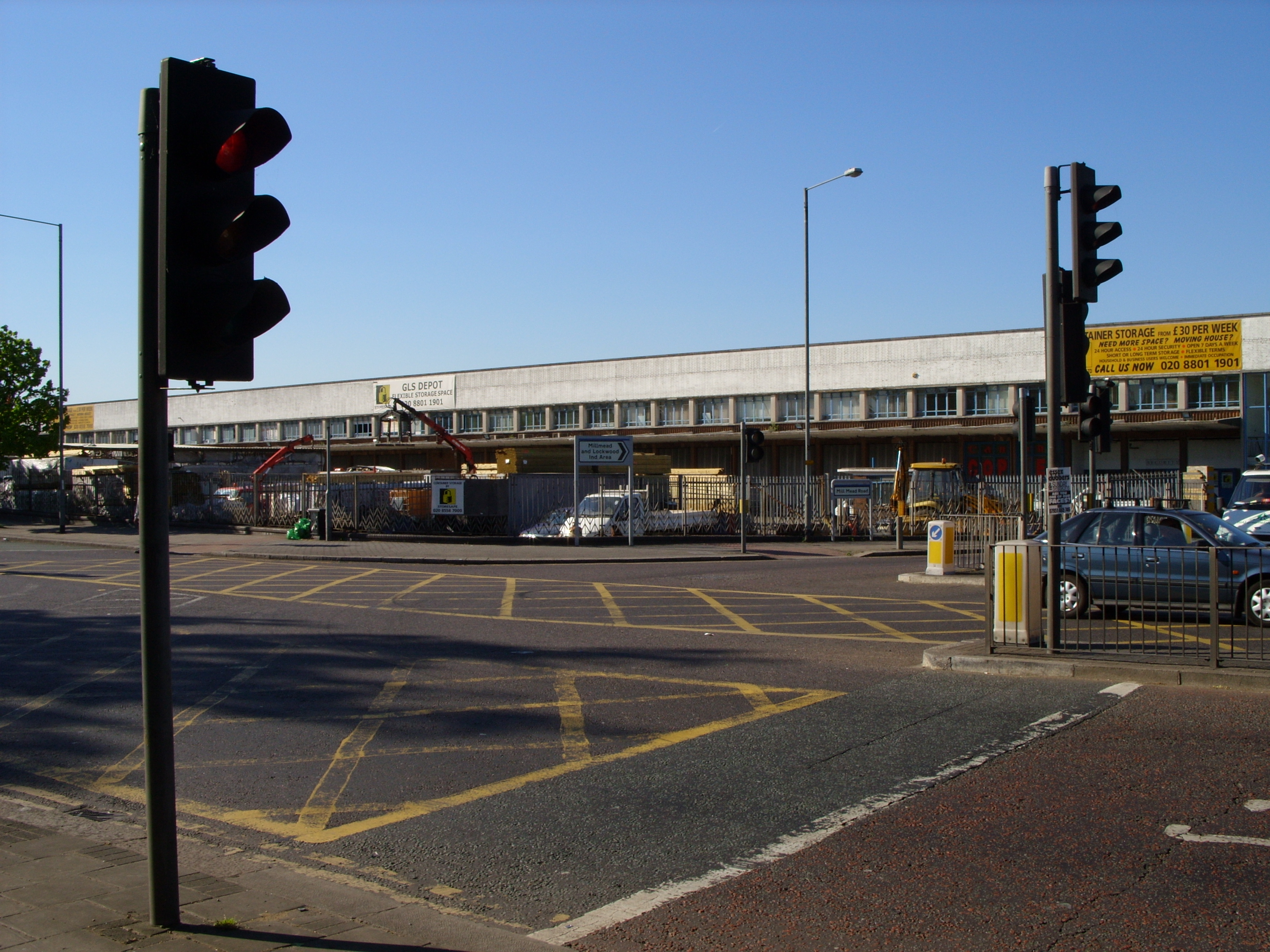
The GLS Warehouse at the junction of Ferry Lane and Mill Mead Road, behind Tottenham Hale station. Now demolished.

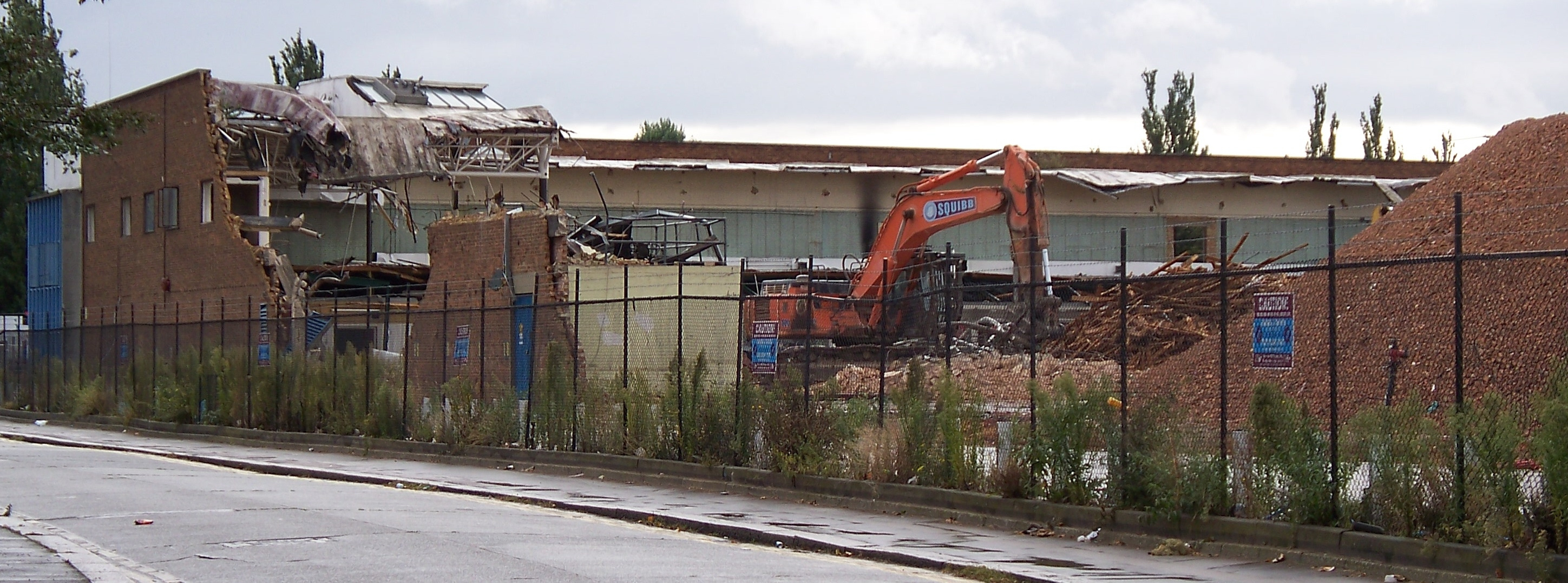
Demolition of the GLS Warehouse, 2007.

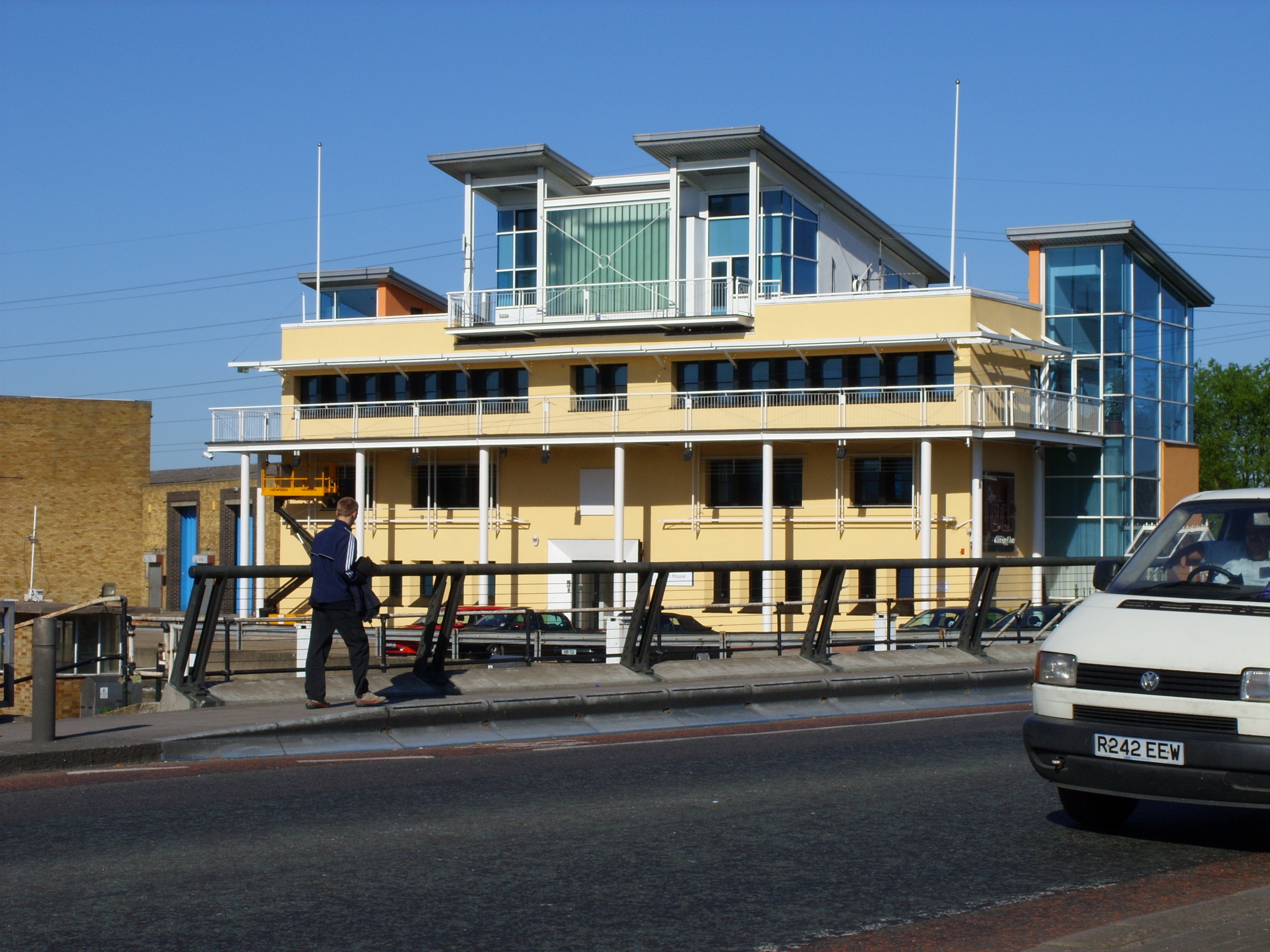
Heron House in 2007. Now demolished, formerly on the Hale Wharf site.

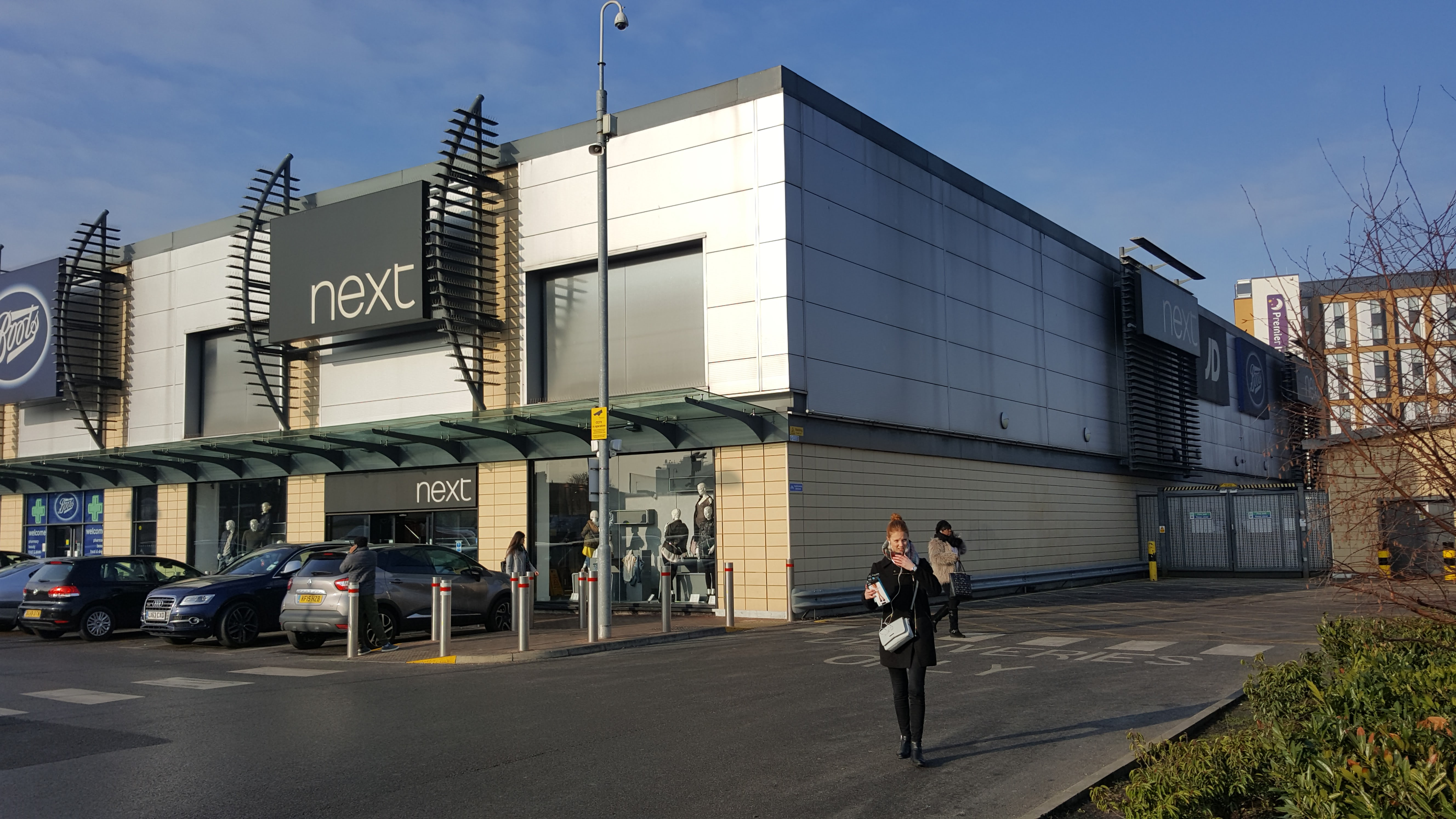
Tottenham Hale Retail Park

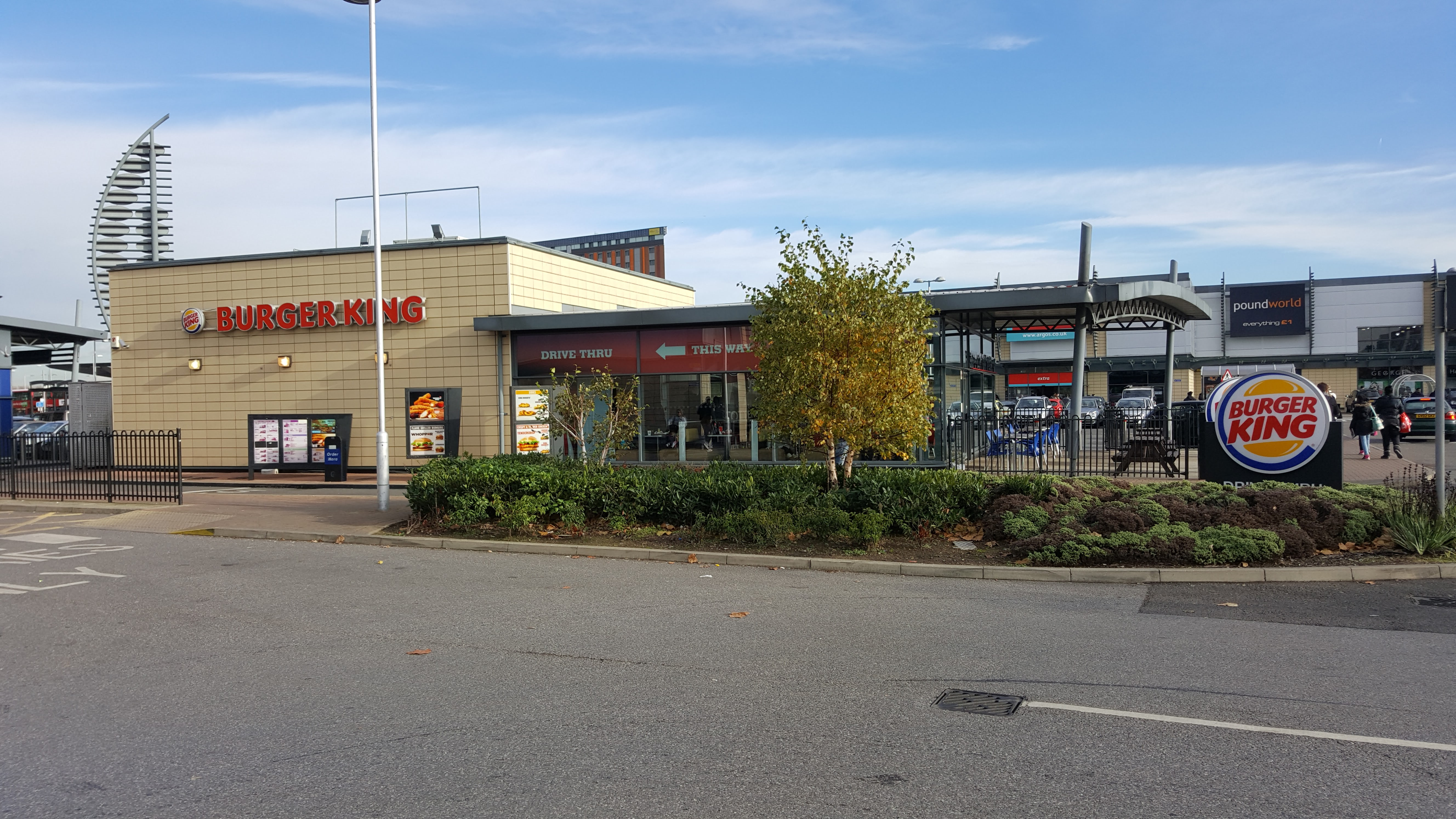
Tottenham Hale Retail Park
