= Print Audit =

Canadian software company

- Type: Private Company
- Industry: Managed Print Services
- Founded: 1999
- Headquarters: Calgary, Canada
- Key people: John MacInnes, President and CEO
- Products: Print Management and Cost Recovery Software
- Website: www.printaudit.com

Print Audit is a private company that provides print tracking and copy auditing tools to office equipment dealers and end-users. The company's main software product is Print Audit 6.

In addition to its headquarters in Calgary, Alberta, Canada, the company has offices in the United Kingdom, South Africa, Australia and Latin America.

== History ==
The company was co-founded in December 1999 by John MacInnes to create products that could help companies recover the costs associated with photocopying. Over the next ten years, the company developed print and photocopying products to track, analyze and control the printing patterns of organizations. The company asserts that to date it has installed print management software on 2 million workstations worldwide.

== Products ==
=== Print Management Products ===
| Print Audit 6 | a suite of three client based print management software modules (Analysis, Rules and Recovery) that allow organizations to track, manage and reduce their printing |
| Copy Audit Numeric | allows professional service firms to track walk-up photocopying costs |
| Copy Audit Touch | allows users to track walk-up photocopying costs, consisting of flexible software and hardware combinations |
| Print Audit Embedded | allows users to track and charge for walk-up copying, faxing, scanning and server printing without external hardware |
| Print Audit Secure | allows users to release their print jobs at any device with their smartphone or a web-enabled computer.. |

=== Dealer Sales Tools ===
| Print Audit Assessor | provides office equipment dealers with short-term print tracking capability to conduct assessment of client print environments |
| Print Audit Infinite Device Management | allows office equipment dealers to manage fleets of copiers, printers, fax machines and multi-function devices |
| Print Audit Rapid Assessment Key | a USB device that collects print data on networked imaging devices without installing hardware or software |

== Awards and recognition ==
- 2012 U.S. Military Certificate of Networthiness
