= Thermofax =

Thermographic photocopying technology

Thermo-Fax (very often Thermo fax) is 3M's trademarked name for a photocopying technology which was introduced in 1950. It was a form of thermographic printing and an example of a dry silver process. It was a significant advance as no chemicals were required, other than those contained in the copy paper itself. A thin sheet of heat sensitive copy paper was placed on the original document to be copied, and exposed to infrared energy. Wherever the image on the original paper contained carbon, the image absorbed the infrared energy when heated. The heated image then transferred the heat to the heat sensitive paper producing a blackened copy image of the original.

== Model 12 ==
The first commercially available Thermofax machine was the Model 12. The 'layup' of the original and the copy paper was placed on a stationary glass platen and an infrared lamp and reflector assembly moved beneath the glass, radiating upwards. The layup was held in position by a lid with an inflatable rubber bladder that was latched down by the user.

== Model 17 ==
In subsequent versions, beginning with the Model 17, the layup was fed into a slot, and continuously exposed as it passed the lamp and reflector. The Model 17 and successors were table-top machines, approximately the size of a typewriter from the same era.

== Q system ==
A variation of this technology was a billing system called the Q System, typically used by medical and dental offices. A 'master' composed of a sheet of heavy backing paper and a thin sheet of ruled paper attached to it at the top edge was created for each patient. Billing entries were then made in pencil on the thin sheet for each patient visit. To create a billing copy, a sheet of heat sensitive paper was inserted between the backing and the entry sheet and passed through the ThermoFax machine, the Model 47 being the most commonly used.

== Transparencies ==
As copying technology advanced, Thermofax machines were subsequently marketed as a method of producing transparencies (viewgraphs) for overhead projector presentations. A sheet of heat-sensitive clear stock was placed on top of the original, and passed through a ThermoFax, producing a black image on the clear stock. This application saw a common usage well into the 1980s, and specialized uses thereafter.

== Modern uses ==
As of 2009, Thermofax machines were still widely used by artists. In addition to making copies, Thermofax machines can be used to make a "spirit master" for spirit duplicator machines. Tattoo artists use these spirit masters as tattoo stencils, to quickly and accurately mark the outlines of a tattoo on the skin of the person to be tattooed using a transfer solution. Textile and Printmaking artists use these machines for creating silk screens in several seconds by running a piece of Riso film through with a photocopied image.

Riso film is a Japanese silk screen product composed of a Saran-type plastic that has been bonded to a screen mesh of various sizes. When the Riso film is exposed to the infrared bulb inside the machine, the saran plastic emulsion side opens up wherever there is an ink toner on the photocopy. Paint and other mediums can then be screened once the film is mounted on a frame. The imaging barrel inside the Thermofax is 8.5" wide, but the film can be of any length. These modern uses have kept up the demand for most of the models of Thermofax machines.

Model 45EGA was manufactured with an electrical defect that requires a conversion kit to be installed for safe use of the machine. The 45EGA models that were not converted, are still considered to be fire hazards.

== Disadvantages ==
The Thermofax process was temperamental. The coated paper tended to curl, and being heat-sensitive, copies were not archival. The darkness setting is tricky to adjust, and drifts as the machine warms up. The darkness often varies, some portions of the text being too light and others being too dark. Since the heat absorption of the ink does not necessarily correlate with its visible appearance, there were occasional idiosyncrasies; some inks that looked nearly black to the eye might not copy at all, and an exposure setting that worked well for some originals might require a change to make usable copies with another.

== Cost comparison ==
Thermofax copies were inexpensive. One business book asserts that research conducted by Xerox before introducing their copier came to the conclusion that "nobody would pay 5¢ for a plain-paper copy when they could get a Thermofax copy for a cent-and-a-half." Fortunately, "Xerox ignored the research."

== Contemporary references ==
Contemporary references to the Thermofax process:

- "They did have—what did they call that brown stuff? Thermofax, right. That's the first copying machine and they didn't look like anything at all. They were brown and they faded."
- "Marjorie Spock had invested in one of the earliest models of thermofax machines, which she kept in her basement. It was a crude affair that continually overheated, belching smoke and vile-smelling fumes from odd sprockets and sending out scorched brown paper, sometimes completely burned and only barely legible at best."
- "The only thing we had then, was what they called a thermofax machine, which was very strange. It was on a very bad tissue paper kind of thing and a very obscure image. But we were desperate and it was the only way to make copies."
- "If a typewritten or printed page was placed flat on an illuminated screen and covered with a chemically treated sheet of pinkish paper, it would duplicate on the treated paper when an air-cushioned rubber mat was brought down over it and a strong light turned on underneath."

== Cultural references ==
- Thermofax is the name of a dragon in the text adventure Wishbringer by Infocom.
- The Lord of the Rings parody Bored of the Rings, written by National Lampoon founders Henry N. Beard and Douglas C. Kenney, dubs the magical horse Thermofax (instead of Shadowfax) ridden by 'Goodgulf Greyteeth' (also known as Gandalf Greyhame).

== See also ==
- List of duplicating processes
- Duplicating machines
- Printing
