= Riso Kagaku Corporation =

Japanese corporation

- Native name: 理想科学工業株式会社
- Company type: Public KK
- Traded as: TYO: 6413
- ISIN: JP3974400008
- Industry: Electronics
- Founded: September 2, 1946; 79 years ago
- Founder: Noboru Hayama
- Headquarters: Shiba, Minato-ku, Tokyo 108-8385, Japan
- Area served: Worldwide
- Key people: Akira Hayama (President and CEO)
- Products: Printers; Digital duplicators; Digital screen makers
- Revenue: JPY 85.4 billion (FY 2015) (US$ 762.5 million) (FY 2015)
- Net income: JPY 5.2 billion (FY 2015) (US$ 46.4 million) (FY 2015)
- Number of employees: 3,563 (as of March 31, 2016)
- Website: Official website

Riso Kagaku Corporation (理想科学工業株式会社, Risō Kagaku Kōgyō Kabushiki-gaisha) is a Japanese corporation which is the inventor, manufacturer, and distributor of the RISO Printer-Duplicator, a.k.a. Risograph. This device automatically creates a stencil-type master (from a paper original or digital file), thereby enabling it reproduce single-colour documents at high speed and low cost, in a machine that has a small footprint and a relatively low purchase price.

The firm was established in Tokyo, Japan, where it continues to maintain its headquarters today. With sales in over 150 countries, Riso is a billion-dollar company. The company maintains a foundation that donates equipment around the world primarily to educational institutions.

In Japanese, 'Riso' means 'ideal' and the word 'Kagaku' means 'science.'

Noboru Hayama, the company's founder, started his business by mixing inks at his kitchen sink just after World War II, and in 1946 established a mimeograph printing company, whose first product was its signature duplicator. Over the next few years, Mr. Hayama expanded his company to the area of manufactured emulsion inks, stencil masters, and other duplicating products.

== Sponsorships ==
The company sponsors the J.League football club Kashima Antlers with the RISO logo appearing on the back of the club's shirt.

== See also ==
- Print Gocco
