= GEC Computers =

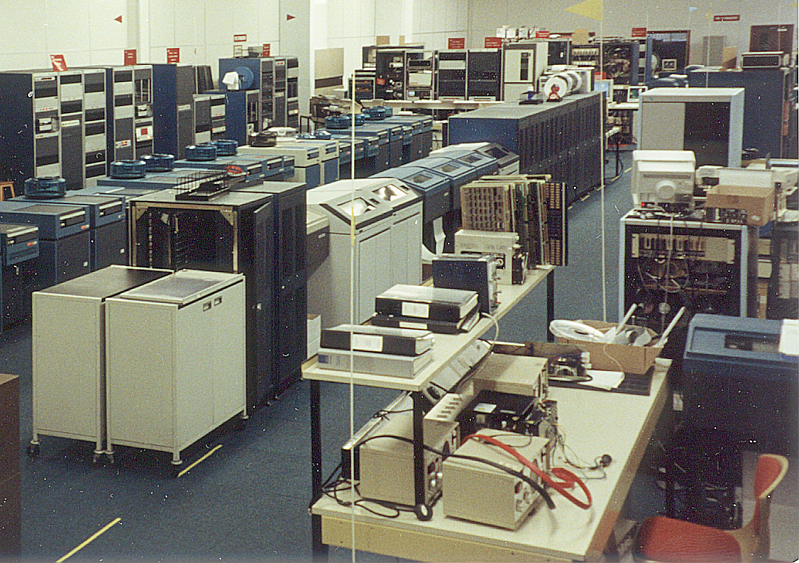
GEC 4000 series computers at the company's Dunstable Development Centre in 1991

GEC Computers Limited was a British computer manufacturing company under the GEC holding company from 1968 until the 1990s.

== History ==
Starting life as Elliott Automation, in 1967–68 the data processing computer products were transferred to ICT/ICL and non-computing products to English Electric as part of a reorganisation of the parent company forced by the British Government. English Electric then merged into the GEC conglomerate in 1968.

Elliott Automation retained the real-time computing systems, the Elliott 900 series computers, and set about designing a new range of computer systems. The rules of the reorganisation did not allow Elliott Automation to continue working on data processing computing products for some years after the split (and similarly, prevented ICT/ICL working on real-time computing products). Three new computer ranges were identified, known internally as Alpha, Beta, and Gamma. Alpha became the GEC 2050 8-bit minicomputer, and beta became the GEC 4080 16-bit minicomputer with its unique Nucleus feature. Gamma was never developed, so a few of its enhanced features were consequently pulled back into the GEC 4080.

The company's main product was the GEC 4000 series minicomputers, which were used by many other GEC and Marconi companies as the basis for real-time control systems in industrial and military applications. Development of new computers in the series continued through most of the life of the company. Other products manufactured in the earlier years were the GEC 2050, computer power supplies, and high resolution military computer displays, as well as the Elliott 900 series for existing Elliot customers. GEC Computers also found that some of the software applications it developed for its own use were saleable to other companies, such as its salary payment services, its multi-layer printed circuit board design software, and its project management software.

In the mid-1970s, GEC Computers was working on OS4000, a more advanced operating system for the GEC 4000 series. This opened up the 4000 series to more customers, including the academic and research communities. A number of collaborative projects were undertaken, some of which resulted in applications which GEC Computers developed further and sold, in addition to the sales of the computers themselves. One of the largest of these were X.25 packet switch systems, which resulted from a research collaboration with NERC.

In the late 1970s, Post Office Telecommunications developed Prestel on the GEC 4000 series, and this resulted in sales for similar applications all over the world.

In 1979, the company was awarded the Queen's Award for Technical Achievement for the development of the 4000 series, particularly Nucleus.

By 1980, OS4000 was becoming popular in UK academic and research organisations as a multi-user system, with installations at Rutherford-Appleton Laboratory, Daresbury Laboratory, Harwell Laboratory, NERC, Met Office, CERN, in many university physics and/or engineering departments, and as the main central computer service at University College London (Euclid) and Keele University. To cater for this market, in the early 1980s the company partnered with American company A. B. Dick to develop the GEC Series 63, which could run OS6000 (based on OS4000) or UNIX System III, and later UNIX System V; however, sales were disappointing and the 63 series was discontinued in 1987.

The numbers of GEC computer systems around the UK by now meant that GEC Computers had built up a widespread field service organisation, and could guarantee on-site response within hours across pretty much the whole country. This turned out to be a valuable asset. Many new technology companies trying to enter the market struggled when required to provide this type of service, and GEC Computers started taking on third-party field service support for many other companies, including some which competed with GEC Computers' own products. (Some of these operations survived in Telent following the 2005 demise of GEC.)

Throughout the 1980s, GEC Computers expanded from its Borehamwood offices into three large purpose-built factory units in the Woodside Estate, Dunstable. The company closed these as the business contracted in the 1990s.

GEC Computers' extensive presence in UK academic and research organisations, and its field service organisation, led Sun Microsystems to choose GEC Computers to be its presence in the UK for the launch of its Sun-2 product range in the early 1980s, which GEC Computers sold under the name of GEC Series 42. GEC Computers developed some reduced cost workstations called the GEC Series 21, based on Atari 520ST and 1040ST systems with replaced PROM operating system code. GEC Computers was not particularly successful at selling the Sun systems, and Sun opened UK offices to sell direct, although GEC Computers' field service continued to support Sun Microsystems across the UK for many years, until Sun built up its own field service organisation.

At the company's peak in the early 1980s there were about 1,600 employees, mainly based in the original Elliott building at Borehamwood, and at Dunstable. There were a number of small offices in many other countries too.

By the 1990s, the real-time process control market was moving to cheaper microprocessor-based systems, and GEC 4000 series sales into that market dried up. X.25 networks were being replaced by Internet networks, and so X.25 packet switch sales dwindled too. This left just the Videotex sales to other countries, and so the company concentrated on this product. However, there was only a window of a few years before the World Wide Web displaced Videotex systems, and the last of the company's main markets ended.

From the mid-1990s, manufacture of systems ceased, although maintenance of installed systems and third-party maintenance continues today (2019).

== Company name ==

The company had many names throughout its lifetime, although GEC Computers is probably the best known in connection with the company's main products of the 1970s and 1980s. The sequence of company names was:

- Elliott Automation
- Marconi Elliott Computer Systems
- GEC Computers Limited
- GPT Computers Limited
- GPT Data Systems
- GPT Video and Data Systems

after which the remains of the company folded into Marconi Communications, and subsequently into Telent.

GEC Computers was granted permission by GEC to not use the usual GEC logo on its products, as the logo was seen as rather old-fashioned (even in the early 1970s) for the new branding for the company.

== Products and services ==
- Inherited the Marconi Transistorised Automatic Computer (T.A.C.), employed in nuclear power stations for data presentation
- Inherited the Marconi Myriad, but probably only maintained existing ones
- Inherited English Electric M2100, but probably only maintained existing ones
- Elliott 900 series
- GEC 2050
- GEC 4000 series, and operating systems COS, DOS, OS4000, SCP-2
- GEC Series 21
- GEC Series 42 (Sun-2 and Sun-3)
- GEC Series 63
- Early switched-mode power supply OEM
- Early high-resolution colour visual display units (mainly for military use)
- Computing consulting services (mainly to other GEC companies)
- Third-party maintenance
- X.25 packet switches
- Public Videotex and private Viewdata systems
- Third-party electronic and cable assemblies manufacture
