= OOMK =

Artist collective

OOMK (one of my kind)
- Years active: 2014–present
- Known for: OOMK Zine, Rabbits Road Press
- Style: Graphic Design, Illustration, Writing

OOMK (one of my kind) is an artist collective based in London, UK, with a focus on publishing, operated by Sofia Niazi, Rose Nordin and Heiba Lamara. They are known for the OOMK Zine, a magazine which explores "the art, ideas and activism of women." Sofia Niazi and Rose Nordin formed the group in 2014, with Heiba Lamara joining at the launch of the first issue of OOMK. Together, they also operate Rabbits Road Press, which is a "community and education focused risograph print studio." They are currently residents at Somerset House Studios with the intent to publish two "Independence" themed publications during their residency here, along with their continued work on the curation of events and discussions in regards to self-publishing.

== Associated Contributors ==
The group currently consists of three main contributors, they are:

- Sofia Niazi [llustrator/Educator]
- Rose Nordin [Graphic designer]
- Heiba Lamara [Researcher]

== Official Residencies ==
OOMK have taken place at several residencies. They are as follows:

- South London Gallery - September, 2017 - May 2018
- Somerset House Studios - November, 2017–Present

During their time at South London Gallery, and led by Sofia Niazi, OOMK worked with children aged 4–11 at Oliver Goldsmith Primary School to found The Big Family Press. While OOMK no longer run The Big Family Press, it is still ongoing through South London Gallery and is supported by the National Lottery Heritage Fund.

== Rabbits Road Press ==
Rabbits Road Press is a risograph printing studio and publishing press operated by the members of OOMK. Currently based at Old Manor Park Library, a community centre in London, they provide printing and book-binding services for nearby communities, artists and groups. In addition to this, Rabbits Road Press also manage and provide workshops centred around community publishing and book-binding, as well as open-access risograph printing sessions and private printing workshops. They are supported by Arts Council England.
