= Marconi Myriad =

The Marconi Myriad was an early computer designed by the Marconi Company in the 1960s. There were three models.

Myriad was a 24-bit machine largely built using integrated circuits from Ferranti which were packaged in small "TO-5" type cans. The architecture was "conventional", and was developed largely by the in-house Marconi team that designed the Marconi Transistorised Automatic Computer, a physically larger computer based on SB345 discrete surface-barrier transistors. These earlier machines were used successfully by the Royal Radar Establishment (RRE) and the Road Research Laboratory in the UK. In Sweden they were used by the Government in their "Fur Hat" defence system and in the Air Force where two computers were used for the meteorological service from the late 1960s to early 1990s. They also provided flight data for UK military air traffic control for 15 years. In Australia, two Myriads were used as part of each of the AF/TPS-802 "HUBCAP" air-defence systems from 1967–97. The Myriads were used in a coupled mode with one providing a radar data extractor and data quantiser role, and the other driving display overlays and tactical display information on radar and tactical screens.

== Myriad I ==
In 1964, a Myriad prototype was displayed at a major computer show in London. To catch the public's attention, it was decided to deploy a model HO railroad layout containing numbered (1–10) rolling stock. The public were invited to enter the order in which they wanted to see the train assembled. Immediately Myriad developed a strategy for shunting trucks around the tracks to assemble the train correctly.

Myriad production started in 1965.

The Myriad I computer was mounted in a small desk format and weighed 1,200 pounds (540 kg). Eight bit paper tape was (somewhat) standard input (the software could handle data input in either the ASCII or the rather idiosyncratic KDF9 character codes) – but a high speed 1000-characters per second electrostatic reader made by Facit was capable of projecting paper tape across a room in spectacular fashion. A high-speed printer was provided. The major machine cycle time was around 800 nanoseconds, with inner cycles around 200 nanoseconds.

Most early programming was performed in very amenable and complete assembly code. Some use was also made of a subset of Coral 66 known as Mini-Coral. The 24-bit architecture provided a logical and flexible address/data environment but the 15-bit address limited the memory size to 32K 24-bit words. The operating system allowed multiple programs to run concurrently but most systems were coded "on the bare metal". Addressing allowed easy integration of external computing and display equipment. An embedded parallel bus allowed two Myriads and some peripheral expansion devices to be directly addressed. For example, in the "Hubcap" configuration, two 16k Myriads shared a 32k 4-wire core memory "backing store" and could save, retrieve or share information at high speed.

== Myriad II ==
Myriad II was demonstrated for the first time at the 1966 exhibition in Munich.

== Myriad III ==
Myriad III was announced in 1970.

The Myriad was used in several defence systems and air traffic control systems such as the Linesman/Mediator and the Paris system. It was used by the National Physics Laboratory UK, and a road traffic control system in Glasgow. In Cambridge a Myriad computer was used to operate the Ryle Telescope tracking eight dishes across the sky, whilst processing the received interference fringe data in real time. Marconi delivered air defence systems coupled to radar to African and Far East counties using the Myriad. When Marconi attempted to open up the North American market considerable interest was given by the City of Montreal for a traffic control system as well as the Lawrence Seaway authority to control the seaway. A proposal to the Canadian Government for air traffic control systems for three Canadian airports was not accepted being deemed to be too advanced for the then current level of training for air traffic controllers.

Marconi Automation spent a year developing a proposal in conjunction with Wimpey's of London to produce petrol chemical plant design system which would not only produce accurate tske-off schedules but would flag any instances of pipe conflicts. When Wimpey bought an ICL 1900 computer the management asked that the system be run on that machine. This was not possible.

Canadian Marconi in Montreal had very advanced technology in integrated circuits and multiple level printed circuits from doppler navigation unit manufacture for the US Government and so a proposal was put forward to use these technologies for both the Myriad and the Elliot Bros computers. The proposal was not adopted due to Canadian Marconi's senior management's lack of computer knowledge and incorrect understanding.

In the late 1960s the Myriad was shown at a computer show in South Africa but unfortunately the machine was dropped out of the transporting aircraft resulting in the chassis being considerably distorted. The Myriad was placed against a wall and pushed back into shape using a fork lift truck. The machine then behaved perfectly at all the events where it was shown.

The Myriad was used extensively by the Marconi semiconductor division to design integrated circuits with facilities far in advance of other programs.

== See also ==
- GEC Computers
- AN/TPS-43
- Marconi Transistorised Automatic Computer (T.A.C.)
