= A. B. Dick Company =

Former American printing equipment manufacturer

- Type: Defunct
- Industry: Graphic Arts Equipment
- Founded: Chicago, Illinois, United States, 1883
- Founder: Albert Blake Dick
- Defunct: July 2004
- Headquarters: Niles, Illinois, United States
- Key people: Albert Blake Dick, Founder; Albert Blake Dick Jr., second president A. B. Dick III, third president Karl Van Tassel, president John C. Stetson, president Ed Suchma final president and CEO
- Revenue: $268.62 million (1998 est.)
- Number of employees: about 900, mid-1930s about 1,200 in 1996
- Website: http://www.abdick.com/

The A. B. Dick Company (later stylized as ABDick) was a major American manufacturer of copy machines and office supplies in the late 19th century and 20th century.

== Founding and growth ==
The company was founded in 1883 in Chicago as a lumber company by Albert Blake Dick (1856 – 1934). It soon expanded into office supplies and, after licensing key autographic printing patents from Thomas Edison, became the world's largest manufacturer of mimeograph equipment (Albert Dick coined the word "mimeograph"). The company introduced the Model 0 Flatbed Duplicator in 1887. Later on, the flatbed duplicators were replaced by devices using a rotating cylinder with automatic ink feed. Basic models were hand-cranked while more elaborate machines used an electric motor.

The company had a new headquarters built in 1926, the building at 728 West Jackson now called Haberdasher Square Lofts, and remained there until their move to suburban Niles in 1949.

AB Dick model 350 and 360 small duplicator presses, paired with Itek Graphix plate makers, were instrumental in the beginnings of instant or "quick" printing shops that proliferated between the 1960s and 1980s. These early plate makers first used paper plates and later used polyester plates made by Mitsubishi. They revolutionized plate making for small press printers with the introduction of digital plate makers in the early 1990s. A. B. Dick also produced machines using the competing spirit duplicator technology. Starting in the 1960s, xerography began to overtake A. B. Dick's older mimeograph technology.

John C. Stetson was president of A. B. Dick when he was appointed Secretary of the Air Force in 1978.

== End of independent existence ==
In 1979, the company was acquired by the British General Electric Company (not to be confused with the American company General Electric). In the early 1980s, following this acquisition, A. B. Dick was involved with GEC Computers in the design of the ill-fated GEC Series 63 minicomputer.

In 1988, the company acquired Itek Graphix, a leading manufacturer of plate-makers for duplicators (small format offset presses). By the late 1990s, A. B. Dick was a division of the Nesco company of Cleveland.

The company filed for bankruptcy in 2004, and its assets were acquired by Presstek, a manufacturer of prepress products. Presstek sold its ABDick division to Mark Andy, Inc. in 2013. Mark Andy continues (as of 2024) to market products under the ABDick brand.
