= Print Gocco =

Discontinued printmaking system

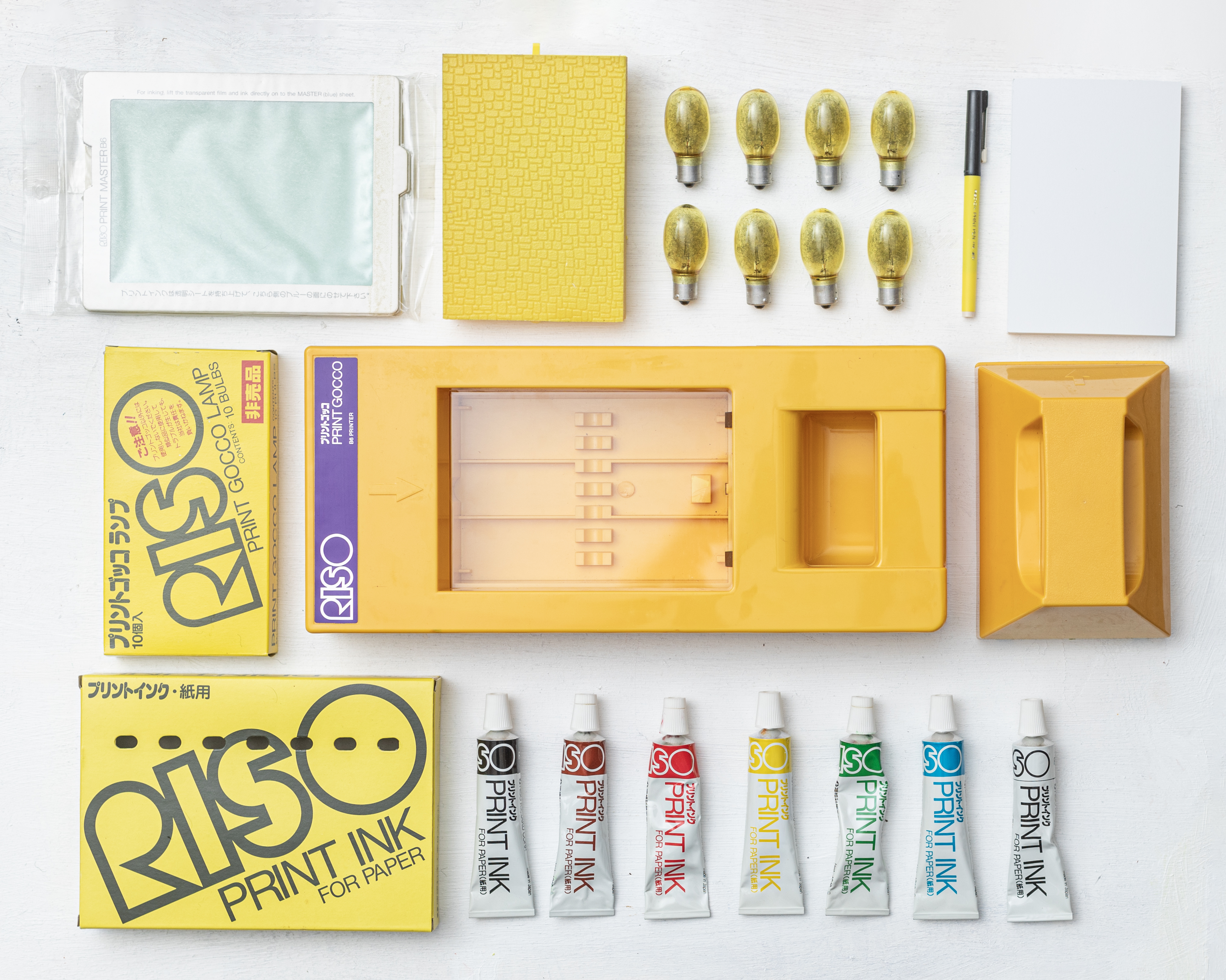
- The Print Gocco B6 printing system
- Type: Printing System
- Invented by: Noboru Hayama
- Company: Riso Kagaku Corporation
- Country: Japan
- Availability: 1977–2008

Print Gocco (プリントゴッコ, Purinto Gokko) was a compact, self-contained card printing system developed by Riso Kagaku Corporation and first sold in 1977. Print Gocco achieved significant success and sold over 10 million units cumulatively before production ceased in 2008.

The system was developed for the Japanese custom of sending New Year's Day postcards (年賀状, nengajō) to friends and relatives.

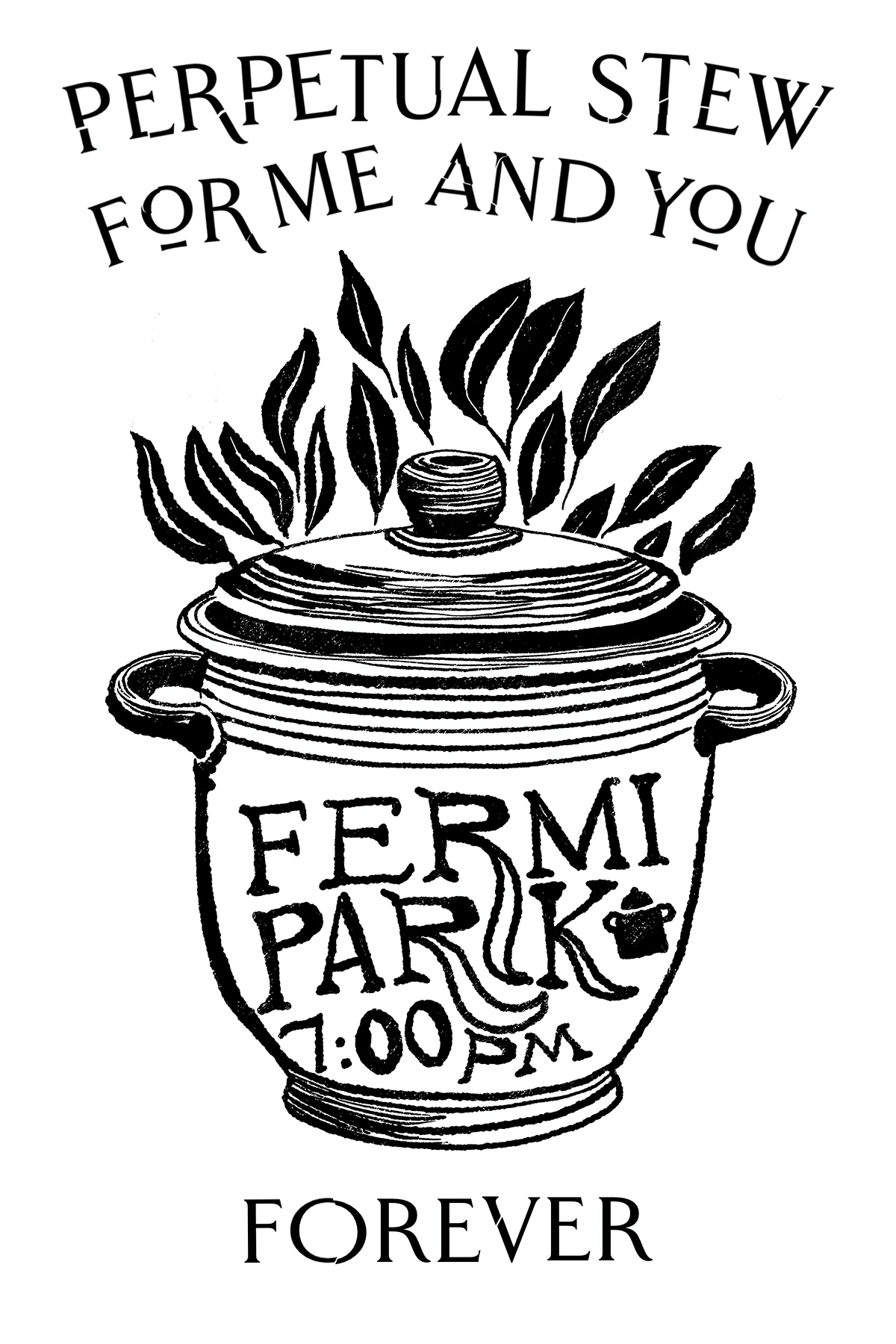
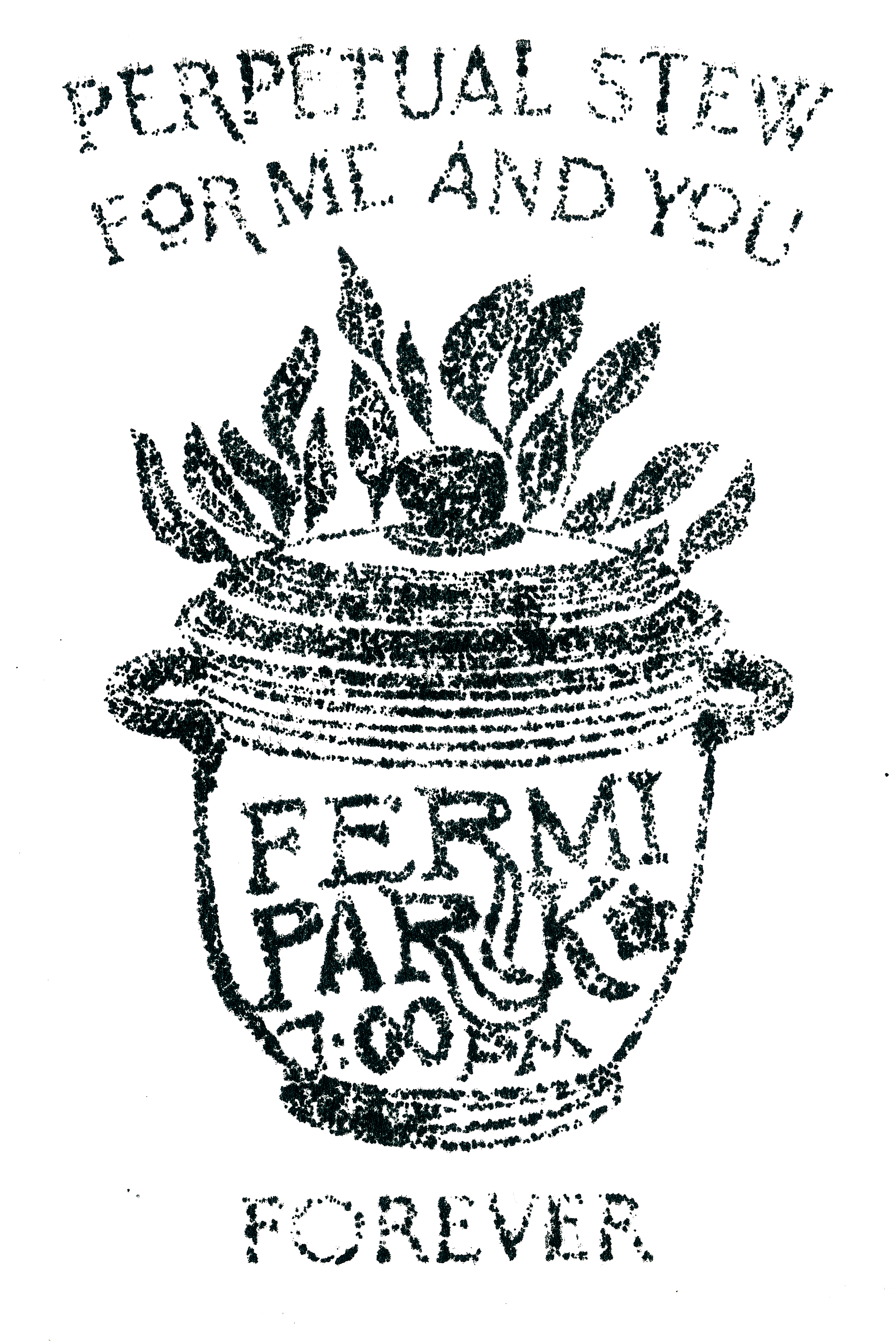
The left-hand image is a digital design of an invite to a perpetual stew event. The right-hand image is a scan of the same design, printed using a Print Gocco device.

Print Gocco's name was derived from the Japanese word gokko (ごっこ), loosely translated as make-believe play. The name and toy-like design of Print Gocco stem from Riso Kagaku president Noboru Hayama's belief in the importance of play. Hayama stated, "make-believe play is a source of intellectual education and its spirit is... an important national heritage. Therefore, I decided to use the word 'Gocco' as a part of this product name."

== Basic operation procedures ==
The Print Gocco process was a variant of screen printing; Print Gocco housed both the screen-making and screen-printing elements within one compact footprint with a hinged plastic frame.

The materials included proprietary blank screens, consisting of thin layer of thermoplastic bonded to a mesh, held in a cardboard frame and covered with transparent film.

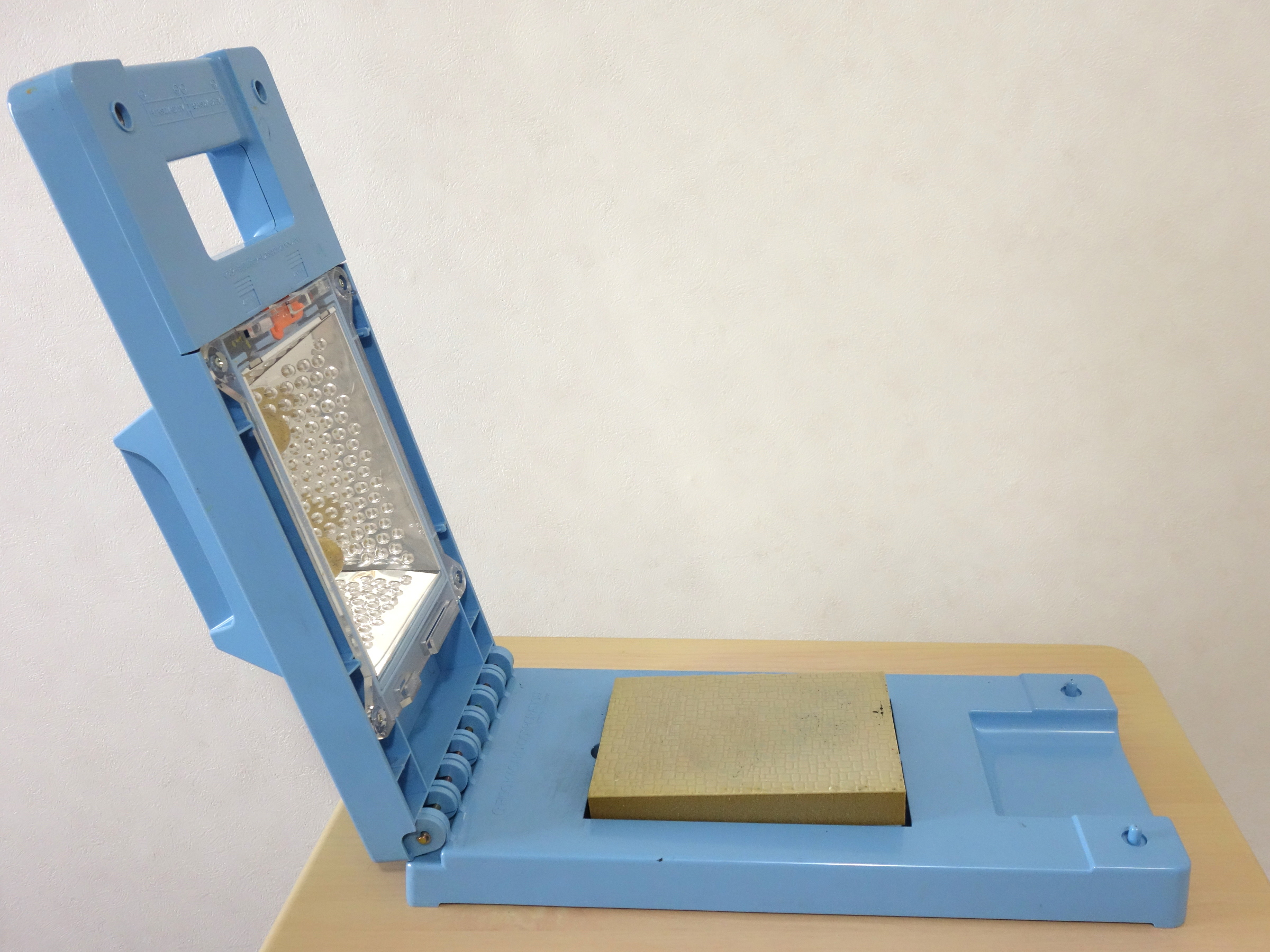
The Print Gocco system.

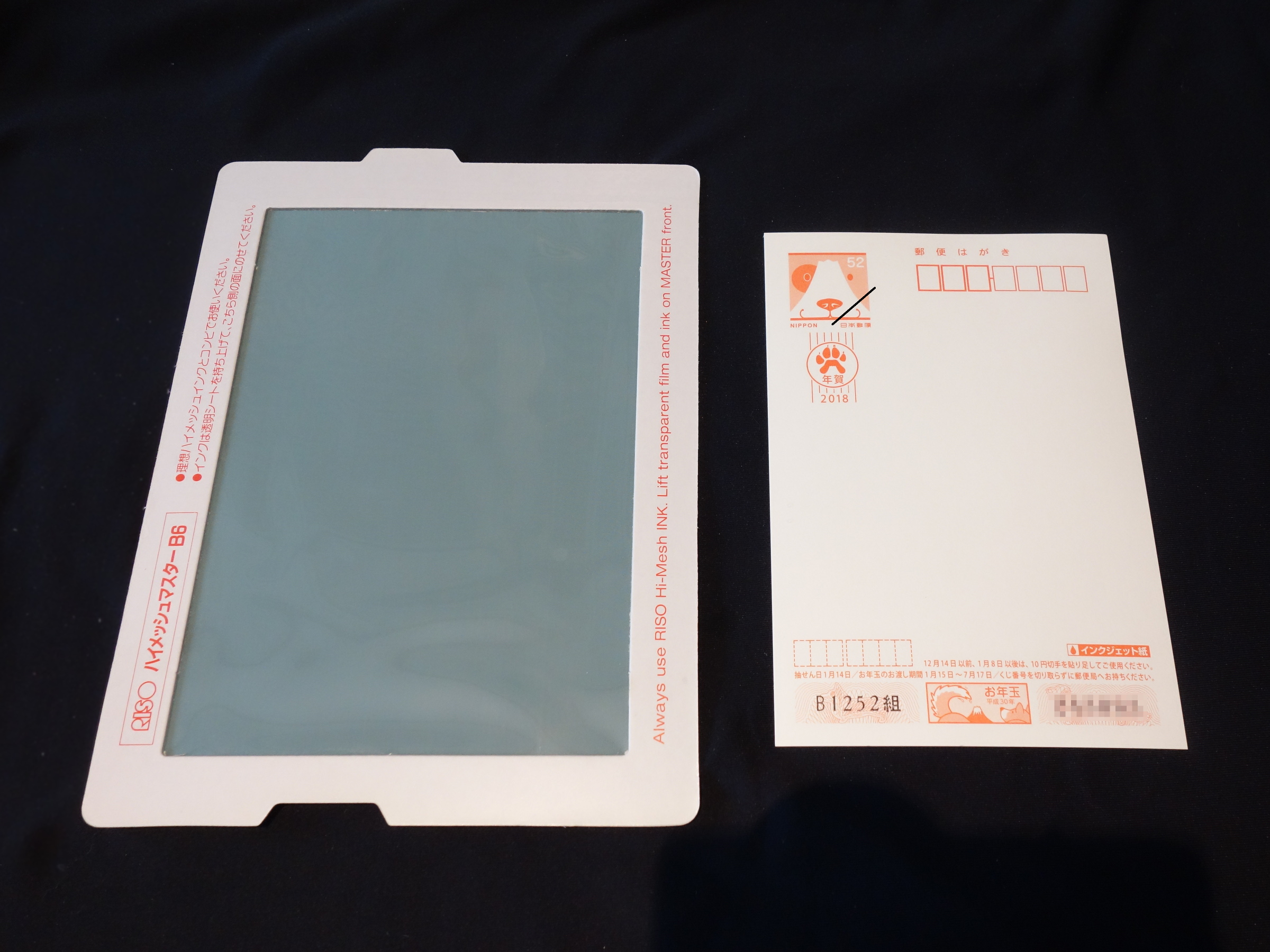
Blank screen

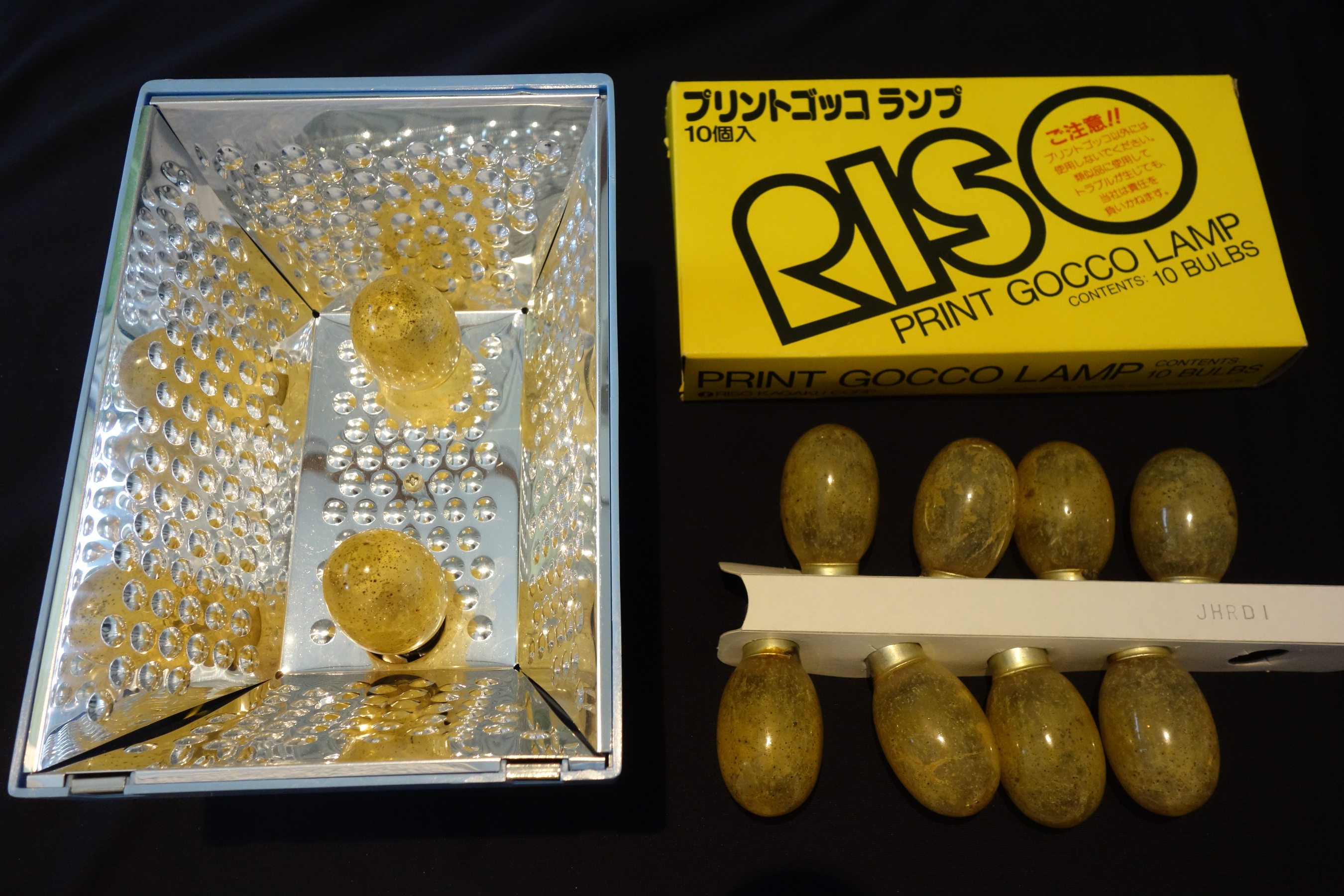
Flash bulbs, used within the Print Gocco lightbox.

=== Making a master screen ===
Print Gocco screens are constructed of a cardboard frame sandwiched between a thin thermoplastic sheet and a perforated mesh.

Artwork is prepared on a card in carbon-based medium.

To produce a master screen, the user places their original card underneath the mesh. Flash bulbs are inserted into the lamp housing and positioned over the artwork. When the flashbulbs fire, the heat from these bulbs is absorbed by the carbon, melting minute holes in the thermoplastic sheet where direct contact with carbon is made, permanently inscribing the original art into the screen and forming a stencil: the finished master screen. This screen is then immediately ready for use.

=== Applying ink and printing ===
With the master screen created, the user can apply ink to its surface. This ink is pushed through the screen to create prints. Unlike in screen printing, the ink is stamped onto the printing medium, rather than being squeegeed across it. This method allows the user to apply different colors of ink in different areas of the screen to produce a multi-color printed image. Alternatively, the user can create multiple master screens for different colors. Once the master screen are prepared and ink applied, the user can begin printing. Cards are inserted onto a pad beneath the master screen. By pushing down on the Print Gocco unit, the inked master screen could then be stamped onto many cards, one at a time.

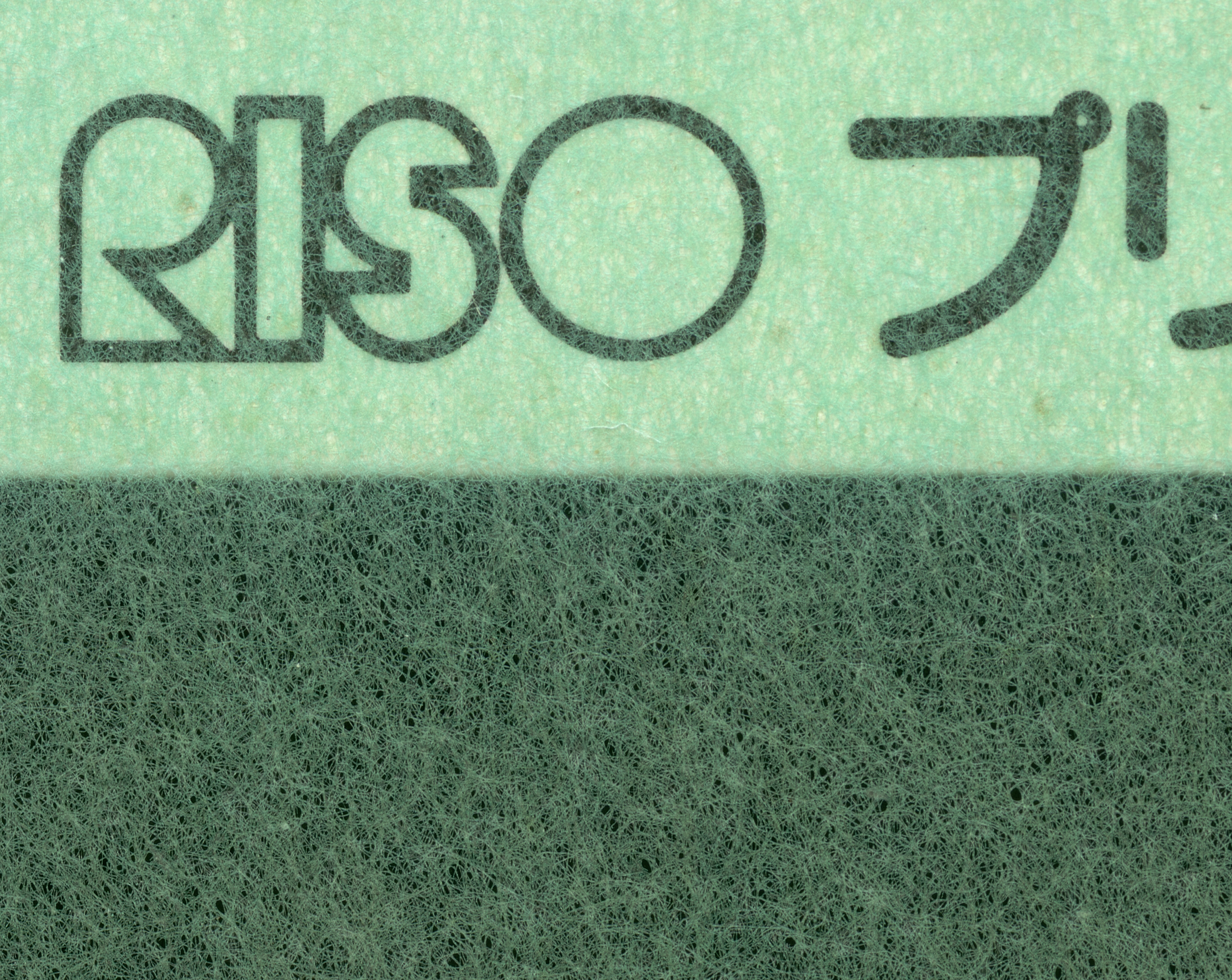
A magnified view of a Print Gocco master screen.

== Decline and discontinuation ==
As personal computers and email became increasingly popular throughout the 1990s, the Japanese market for physical New Year's postcards saw considerable loss. In December 2005, Riso Kagaku Corporation announced it would end production of the Print Gocco system due to low sales. A spokesperson for the company stated that "[Print Gocco] sales were essentially a rounding error to a multinational with revenues in the hundreds of millions of dollars." Riso Kagaku Corporation would continue to manufacture Print Gocco screens, inks and other supplies for the system. In the states, an Internet campaign was started under the domain savegocco.com to find a new home for the product.

As of June 2007, Riso Kagaku Corporation announced increased interest in Print Gocco in Japan, and had resumed production of several lines of Print Gocco units and they were available in Japan and through limited import retail stores in the United States. Despite this interest, sales did not recover.

On May 30, 2008, Riso Kagaku Corporation announced that it would stop manufacturing and shipping Print Gocco printers in June 2008. Sales had plummeted, dwindling to a mere one percent of their peak volume in the 1990s. It blamed the sharp decline in demand for its printers on the increase in use of home printers. It was to continue producing consumable supplies for the printers.

On December 28, 2012, Riso Kagaku Corporation announced that due to declining sales of Print Gocco supplies, it would permanently discontinue all manufacturing related to Print Gocco.

== See also ==
- Risograph
- Screen printing
- Mimeograph machine
