= Mimeograph =

Type of duplicating machine

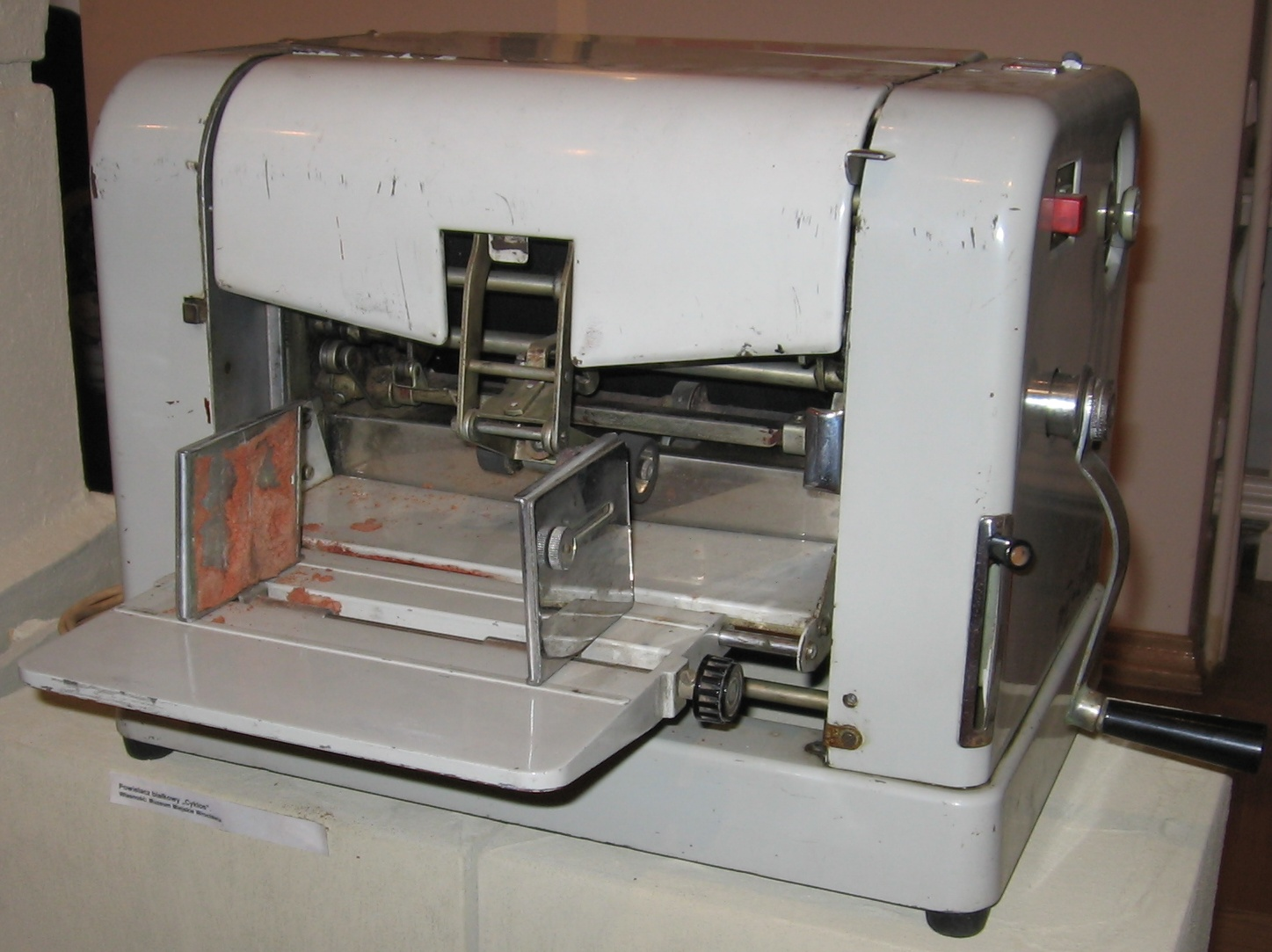
A hand-cranked mimeograph machine used in Poland by opponents of the communist regime after 1981.

A mimeograph machine (the term often being abbreviated to mimeo), sometimes called a stencil duplicator or stencil machine, is a low-cost duplicating machine that works by forcing ink through a stencil onto paper. The process is called mimeography, and a copy made by the process is a mimeograph.

Mimeographs, along with spirit duplicators and hectographs, were common technologies for printing small quantities of a document, as in office work, classroom materials, and church bulletins. For even smaller quantities, up to about five, a typist would use carbon paper. Early fanzines were printed by mimeograph because the machines and supplies were widely available and inexpensive. Beginning in the late 1960s and continuing into the 1980s, photocopying gradually displaced mimeographs, spirit duplicators, and hectographs.

== Origins ==
Use of stencils is an ancient art, but – through chemistry, papers, and presses – techniques advanced rapidly in the late nineteenth century:

=== Papyrograph ===
A description of the Papyrograph method of duplication was published by David Owen:

A major beneficiary of the invention of synthetic dyes was a document reproduction technique known as stencil duplicating. Its earliest form was invented in 1874 by Eugenio de Zuccato, a young Italian studying law in London, who called his device the Papyrograph. Zuccato's system involved writing on a sheet of varnished paper with caustic ink, which ate through the varnish and paper fibers, leaving holes where the writing had been. This sheet – which had now become a stencil – was placed on a blank sheet of paper, and ink rolled over it so that the ink oozed through the holes, creating a duplicate on the second sheet.

The process was commercialized and Zuccato applied for a patent in 1895 having stencils prepared by typewriting.

=== Electric pen ===
Thomas Edison received US patent 180,857 for Autographic Printing on August 8, 1876. The patent covered the electric pen, used for making the stencil, and the flatbed duplicating press. In 1880, Edison obtained a further patent, US 224,665: "Method of Preparing Autographic Stencils for Printing," which covered the making of stencils using a file plate, a grooved metal plate on which the stencil was placed which perforated the stencil when written on with a blunt metal stylus.

The word mimeograph was first used by Albert Blake Dick when he licensed Edison's patents in 1887.

Dick received Trademark Registration no. 0356815 for the term mimeograph in the US Patent Office. It is currently listed as a dead entry, but shows the A.B. Dick Company of Chicago as the owner of the name.

Over time, the term became generic and is now an example of a genericized trademark. (Roneograph, also Roneo machine, was another trademark used for mimeograph machines, the name being a contraction of Rotary Neostyle.)

=== Cyclostyle ===
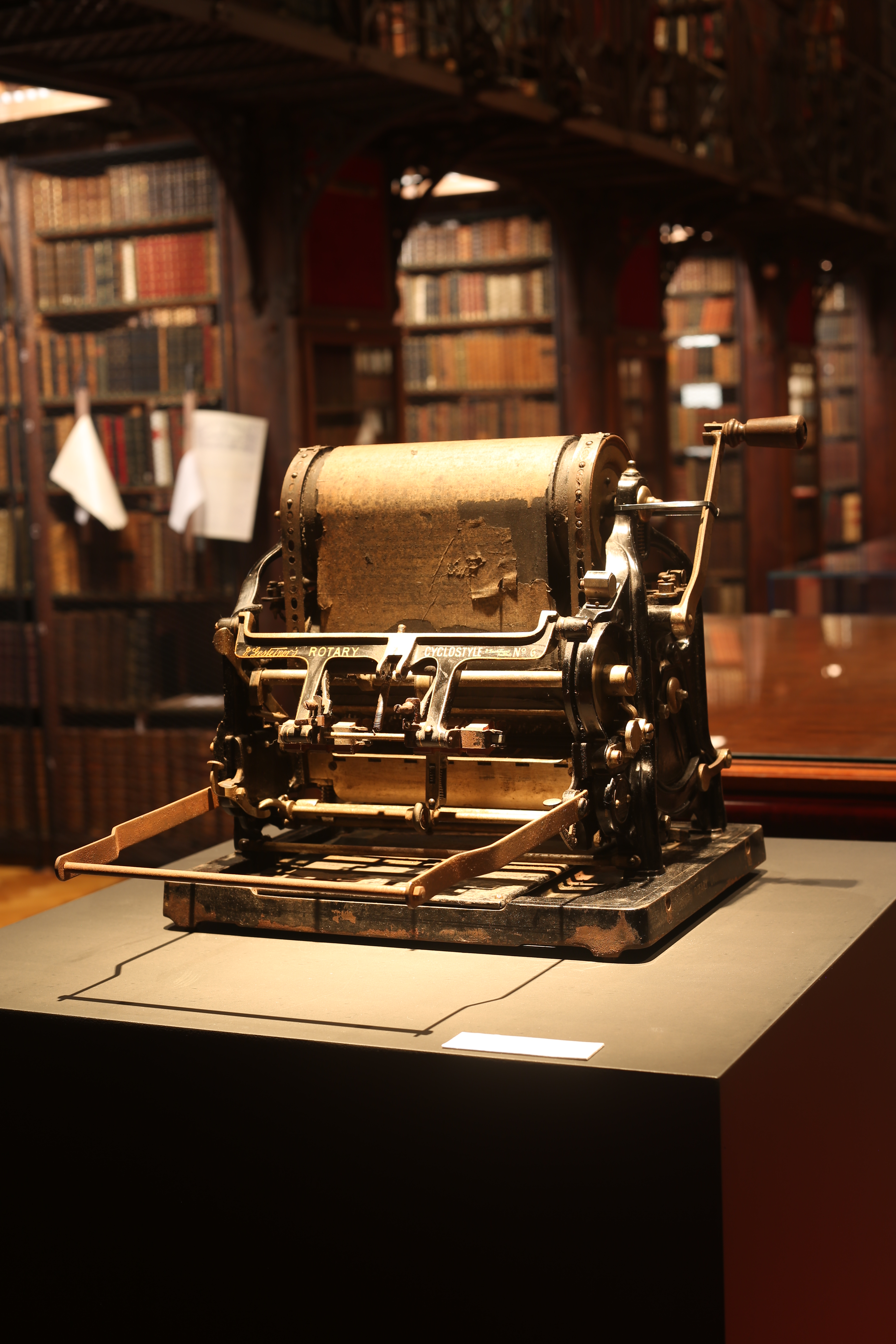
A Rotary Cyclostyle No. 6 duplicating press

In 1891, David Gestetner patented his Automatic Cyclostyle. This was one of the first rotary machines that retained the flatbed, which passed back and forth under inked rollers. This invention provided for more automated, faster reproductions since the pages were produced and moved by rollers instead of pressing one single sheet at a time.

By 1900, two primary types of mimeographs had come into use: a single-drum machine and a dual-drum machine. The single-drum machine used a single drum for ink transfer to the stencil, and the dual-drum machine used two drums and silk-screens to transfer the ink to the stencils. The single drum (example Roneo) machine could be easily used for multi-color work by changing the drum – each of which contained ink of a different color. This was spot color for mastheads. Colors could not be mixed.

The mimeograph became popular because it was much cheaper than traditional print – there was neither typesetting nor skilled labor involved. One individual with a typewriter and the necessary equipment became their own printing factory, allowing for greater circulation of printed material.

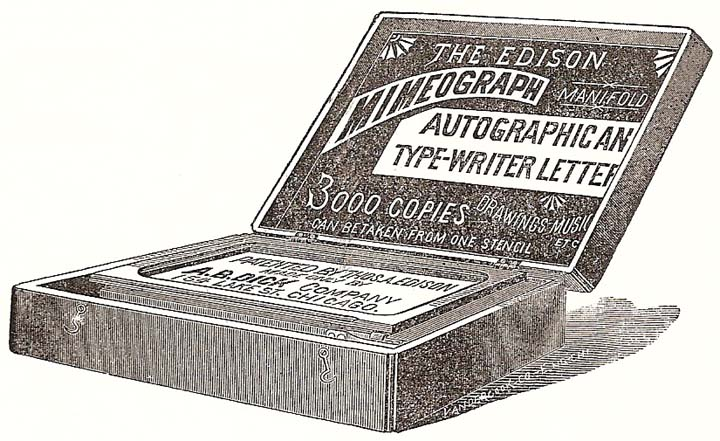
Advertisement from 1889 for the Edison Mimeograph

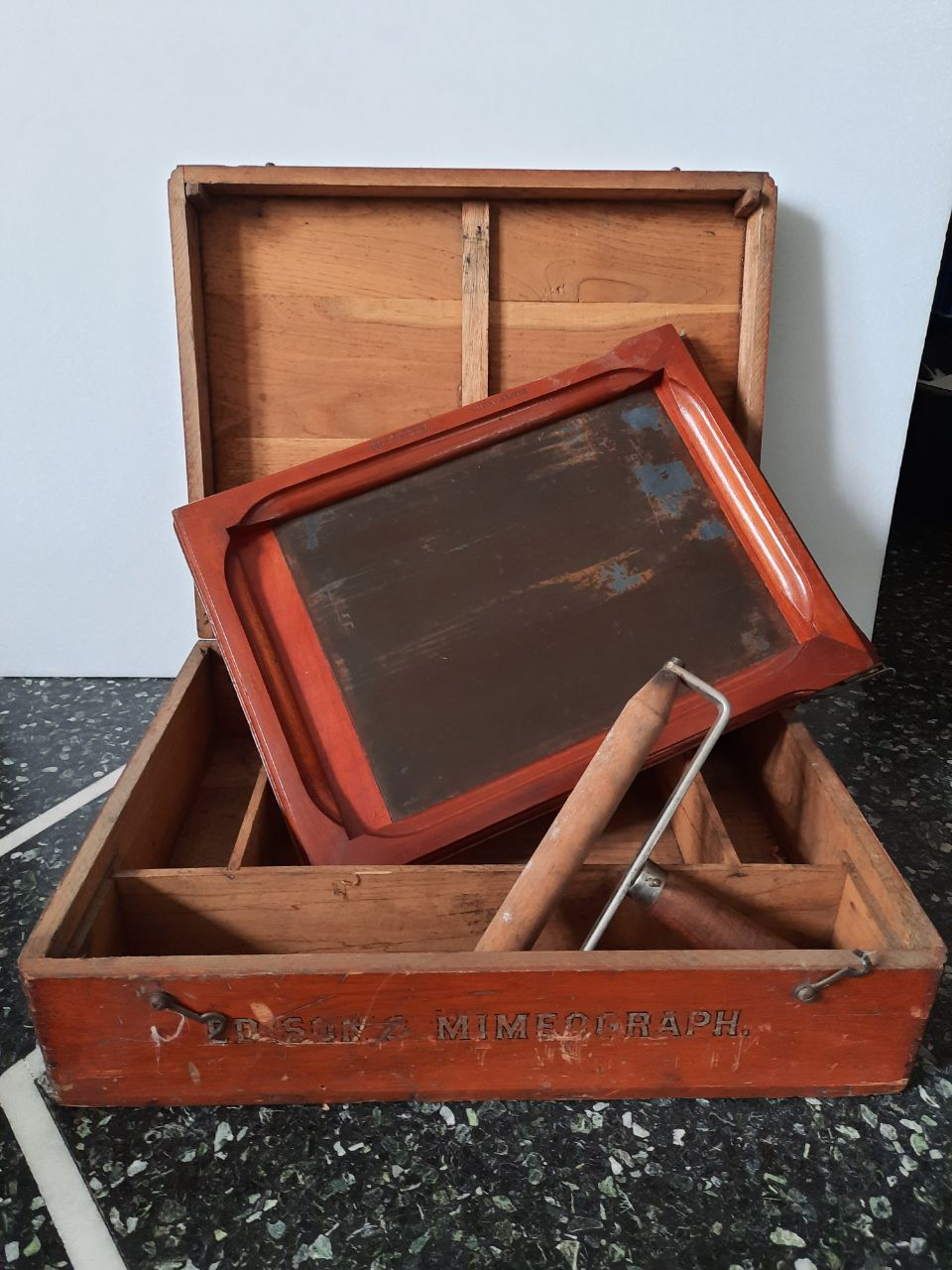
A wooden Edison's mimeograph size 12"

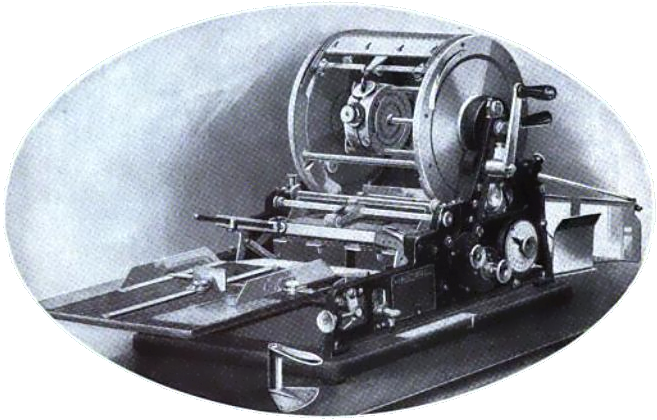
1918 illustration of a mimeograph machine

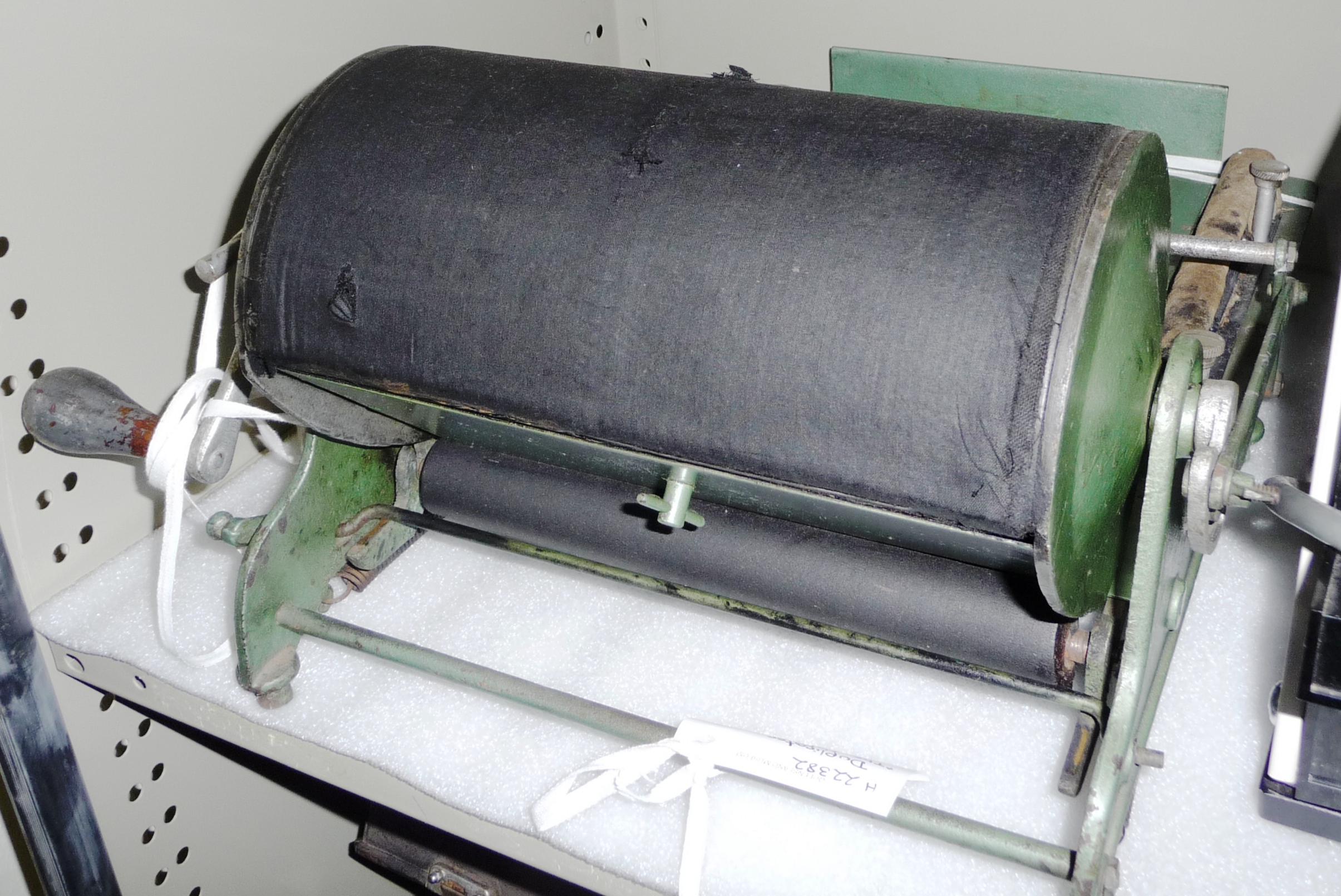
Jackson & O'Sullivan's "The National" Duplicator. Produced in Brisbane, Queensland during World War II.

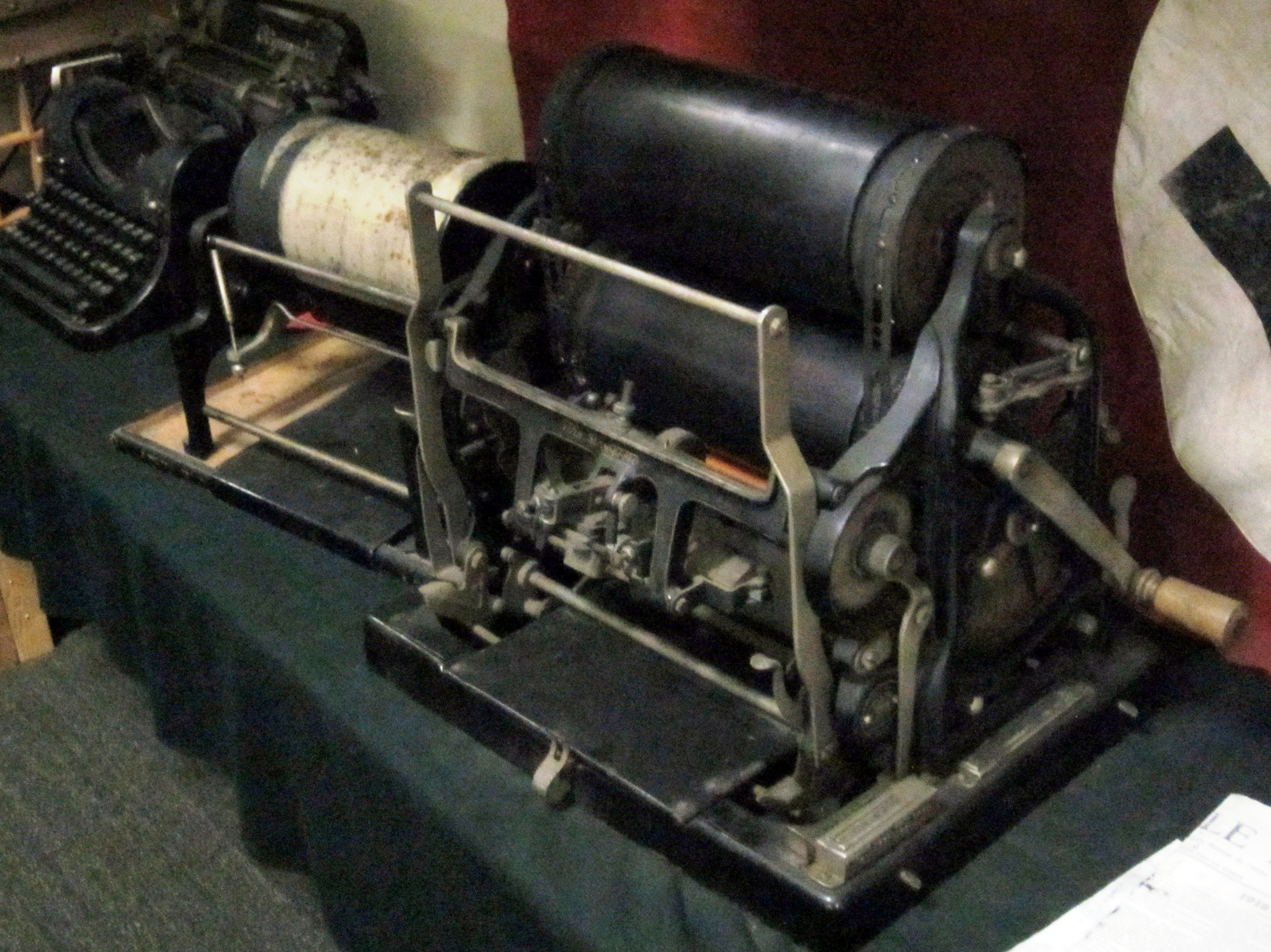
Mimeograph machines used by the Belgian resistance during World War II to produce underground newspapers and pamphlets

== Mimeography process ==
The image transfer medium was originally a stencil made from waxed mulberry paper. Later this became an immersion-coated long-fiber paper, with the coating being a plasticized nitrocellulose. This flexible waxed or coated sheet is backed by a sheet of stiff card stock, with the two sheets bound at the top.

Once prepared, the stencil is wrapped around the ink-filled drum of the rotary machine. When a blank sheet of paper is drawn between the rotating drum and a pressure roller, ink is forced through the holes on the stencil onto the paper. Early flatbed machines used a kind of squeegee.

The ink originally had a lanolin base and later became an oil in water emulsion. This emulsion commonly uses turkey-red oil (sulfated castor oil) which gives it a distinctive and heavy scent.

=== Preparing stencils ===
One uses a regular typewriter, with a stencil setting, to create a stencil. The operator loads a stencil assemblage into the typewriter like paper and uses a switch on the typewriter to put it in stencil mode. In this mode, the part of the mechanism which lifts the ribbon between the type element and the paper is disabled so that the bare, sharp type element strikes the stencil directly. The impact of the type element displaces the coating, making the tissue paper permeable to the oil-based ink. This is called "cutting a stencil".

A variety of specialized styluses were used on the stencil to render lettering, illustrations, or other artistic features by hand against a textured plastic backing plate.

Mistakes were corrected by brushing them out with a specially formulated correction fluid, and retyping once it has dried. (Obliterine was a popular brand of correction fluid in Australia and the United Kingdom.)

Stencils were also made with a thermal process, an infrared method similar to that used by early photocopiers. The common machine was a Thermofax.

Another device, called an electrostencil machine, sometimes was used to make mimeo stencils from a typed or printed original. It worked by scanning the original on a rotating drum with a moving optical head and burning through the blank stencil with an electric spark in the places where the optical head detected ink. It was slow and produced ozone. Text from electrostencils had lower resolution than that from typed stencils, although the process was good for reproducing illustrations. A skilled mimeo operator using an electrostencil and a very coarse halftone screen could make acceptable printed copies of a photograph.

During the declining years of the mimeograph, some people made stencils with early computers and dot-matrix impact printers.

=== Limitations ===
Unlike spirit duplicators (where the only ink available is depleted from the master image), mimeograph technology works by forcing a replenishable supply of ink through the stencil master. In theory, the mimeography process could be continued indefinitely, especially if a durable stencil master were used (e.g. a thin metal foil). In practice, most low-cost mimeo stencils gradually wear out over the course of producing several hundred copies. Typically the stencil deteriorates gradually, producing a characteristic degraded image quality until the stencil tears, abruptly ending the print run. If further copies are desired at this point, another stencil must be made.

Often, the stencil material covering the interiors of closed letterforms (e.g. a, b, d, e, g, etc.) would fall away during continued printing, causing ink-filled letters in the copies. The stencil would gradually stretch, starting near the top where the mechanical forces were greatest, causing a characteristic "mid-line sag" in the textual lines of the copies, that would progress until the stencil failed completely.

The Gestetner Company (and others) devised various methods to make mimeo stencils more durable.

Compared to spirit duplication, mimeography produced a darker, more legible image. Spirit-duplicated images were usually tinted a light purple or lavender, which gradually became lighter over the course of some dozens of copies. Mimeography was often considered "the next step up" in quality, capable of producing hundreds of copies. Print runs beyond that level were usually produced by professional printers or, as the technology became available, xerographic copiers.

== Durability ==
Mimeographed images generally have much better durability than spirit-duplicated images, since the inks are more resistant to ultraviolet light. The primary preservation challenge is the low-quality paper often used, which would yellow and degrade due to residual acid in the treated pulp from which the paper was made. In the worst case, old copies can crumble into small particles when handled. Mimeographed copies have moderate durability when acid-free paper is used.

== Contemporary use ==
Gestetner, Risograph, and other companies still make and sell highly automated mimeograph-like machines that are externally similar to photocopiers. The modern version of a mimeograph, called a digital duplicator, or copyprinter, contains a scanner, a thermal head for stencil cutting, and a large roll of stencil material entirely inside the unit. The stencil material consists of a very thin polymer film laminated to a long-fiber non-woven tissue. It makes the stencils and mounts and unmounts them from the print drum automatically, making it almost as easy to operate as a photocopier. The Risograph is the best known of these machines.

Although mimeographs remain more economical and energy-efficient in mid-range quantities, easier-to-use photocopying and offset printing have replaced mimeography almost entirely in developed countries. Mimeography continues to be used in some developing countries because it is a simple, cheap, and robust technology. Mimeograph machines are operated either by a hand crank or by electricity.

== Uses and art ==
Mimeographs and the closely related but distinctly different spirit duplicator process were both used extensively in schools to copy homework assignments and tests. They were also commonly used for low-budget amateur publishing, including club newsletters and church bulletins. They were especially popular with science fiction fans, who used them extensively in the production of fanzines in the middle 20th century, before photocopying became inexpensive. Mimeographs were also important tools for social movements like the New Left and women in print movement, which sought to establish alternative communications networks for education and organizing. Activist groups and feminist collectives used mimeography to produce periodicals, broadsides, and zines with little time, money, or technical expertise in printing.

Letters and typographical symbols were sometimes used to create illustrations, in a precursor to ASCII art. Because changing ink color in a mimeograph could be a laborious process, involving extensively cleaning the machine or, on newer models, replacing the drum or rollers, and then running the paper through the machine a second time, some fanzine publishers experimented with techniques for painting several colors on the pad.

In addition, mimeographs were used by many resistance groups during World War II as a way to print illegal newspapers and publications in countries such as Belgium.

== See also ==
- Duplicating machines
- Gocco
- List of duplicating processes
- Mimeoscope
- Mimeo Revolution
- Spirit duplicator (also known as a "Rexograph" or "Ditto machine" in the US or a "Banda machine" in the UK)
