= Albert Dick =

American businessman (1856–1934)

Albert Blake Dick (April 16, 1856 – August 15, 1934) was a businessman who founded the A. B. Dick Company, a major American copier manufacturer and office supply company of the 20th Century. He coined the word "mimeograph".

Dick attended school in Galesburg, Illinois, then worked successively for the Brown manufacturing company, Deere & Mansur, and the Moline Lumber Company. He founded the A. B. Dick Company in 1883. It was originally a lumber company before branching into office supplies.

Dick lived in Lake Forest, Illinois. He died at his home there on August 15, 1934.
