= GEC Series 63 =

GEC Series 63 product logo

The GEC Series 63 was a 32-bit minicomputer produced by GEC Computers Limited of the UK during the 1980s in conjunction with A. B. Dick in USA. During development, the computer was known as the R Project. The hardware development (under Dick Ruth and Ed Mack) was done in Scottsdale, Arizona whilst the software was the responsibility of GEC in Dunstable, UK. The hardware made early use of pipeline concepts, processing one instruction whilst completing the preceding one.

Announced in 1983, two operating systems were to be offered: UX63 and OS6000. UX63 was a Unix port derived from UNIX System III, whereas OS6000 was a port of the OS4000 operating system from the GEC 4000 series (under pressure from the marketing department, concerned about compatibility with its existing user base). Subsequently, a version of UNIX System V Release 2 was added - largely to compete with VAX machines which were becoming the fashionable computer of choice amongst academics, concerned about being able to access software from US colleagues. The C compiler, necessary to effect the implementation, was first produced for OS4000 and cross-compiled.

The Unix product was one of the first ports to a different processor architecture undertaken in the UK, with large chunks of the GEC 63 Unix port done at the University of Edinburgh. (Other comparable early Unix ports included that of the High Level Hardware Orion system which launched with 4.1BSD Unix in 1984, ICL's PNX for the PERQ workstation in 1983, and a reported port to a Bleasdale Computer Systems product by Root Computer in early 1983. These ports were likely to have been fully operational before GEC 63 Unix was.)

There were plans for six models, but only two models of the GEC Series 63 were ever produced: the 63/30 and the 63/40. The 63/40 added an embedded GEC 4160 minicomputer running OS4000 to provide additional communications features (such as X.25 and X.29 access).

The Series 63 was used by several UK universities, also being procured with some controversy as part of the Alvey Project, having been chosen as a British-made alternative (along with Systime-produced VAX machines) to the DEC VAX, with DEC's machine being the only one available at the time that was capable of running the specified Berkeley Unix operating system. One of the first student-run university computing facilities in the UK, The Tardis Project, was established in 1988 in the Department of Computer Science of the University of Edinburgh using a Series 63. The name came from the resemblance of the Series 63's large blue cabinet to Doctor Who's time machine.

The Series 63 was discontinued in August 1987 after disappointing sales. Approximately 22 systems were sold during the lifetime of the system.

== See also ==
- GEC Computers
