= Risograph =

Brand of digital duplicators

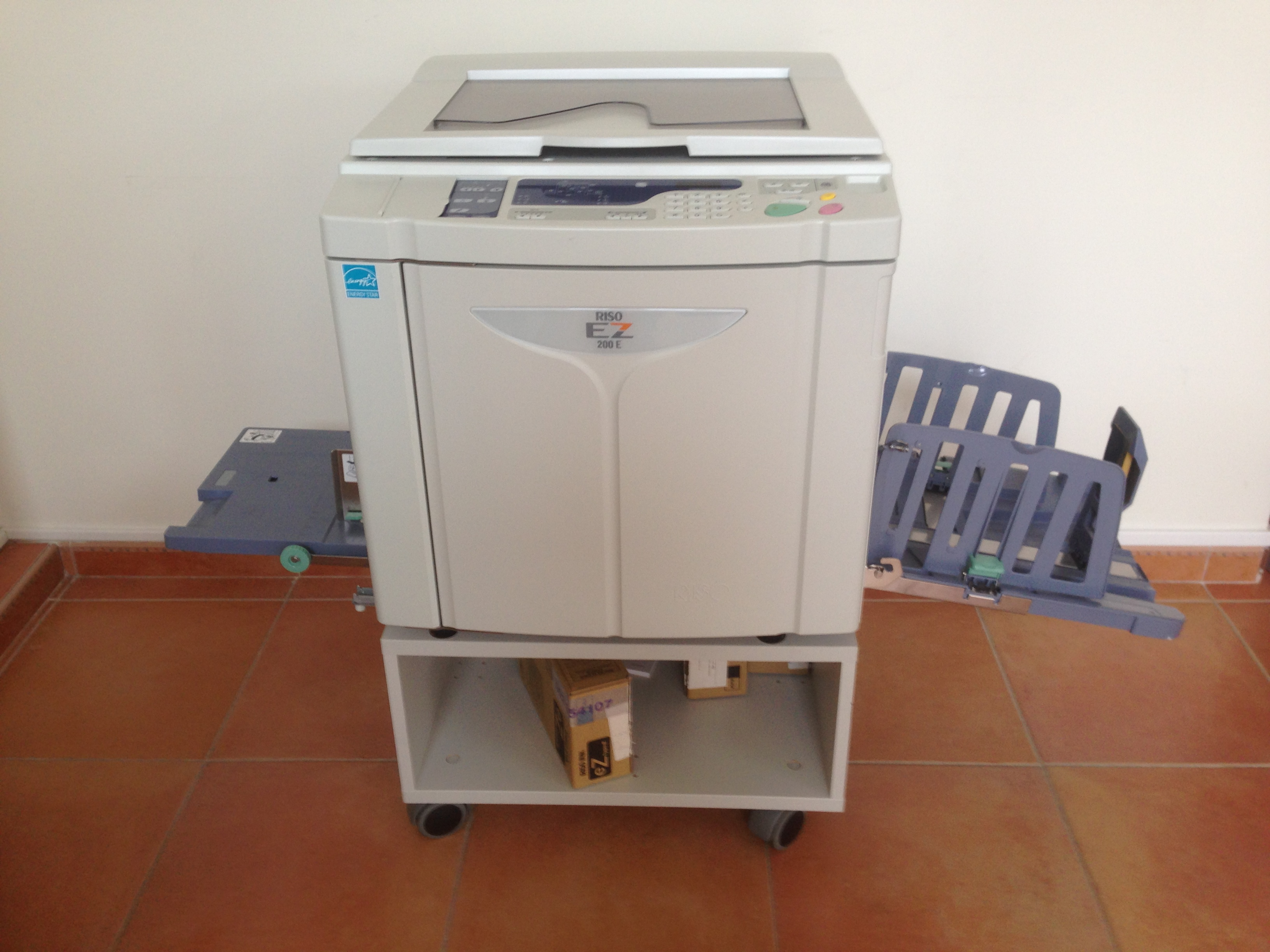
- A Risograph EZ200 Machine
- Developer: Riso Kagaku Corporation
- Type: Digital duplicator
- Released: 1980
- Made in: Japan

Risograph is a brand of digital duplicators manufactured by the Riso Kagaku Corporation. Introduced in Japan in 1980, it is intended mainly for high-volume photocopying and printing. It is sometimes called a printer-duplicator as newer models can be used as a network printer as well as a stand-alone duplicator. When printing or copying many duplicates (generally more than 100) of the same content, it is typically far less expensive per page than a conventional photocopier, laser printer, or inkjet printer. The term "risograph" can refer to the printing process, the final print, or the machine itself. Due to aesthetic and economic considerations, it has gained a cult following in the art community.

== Process ==
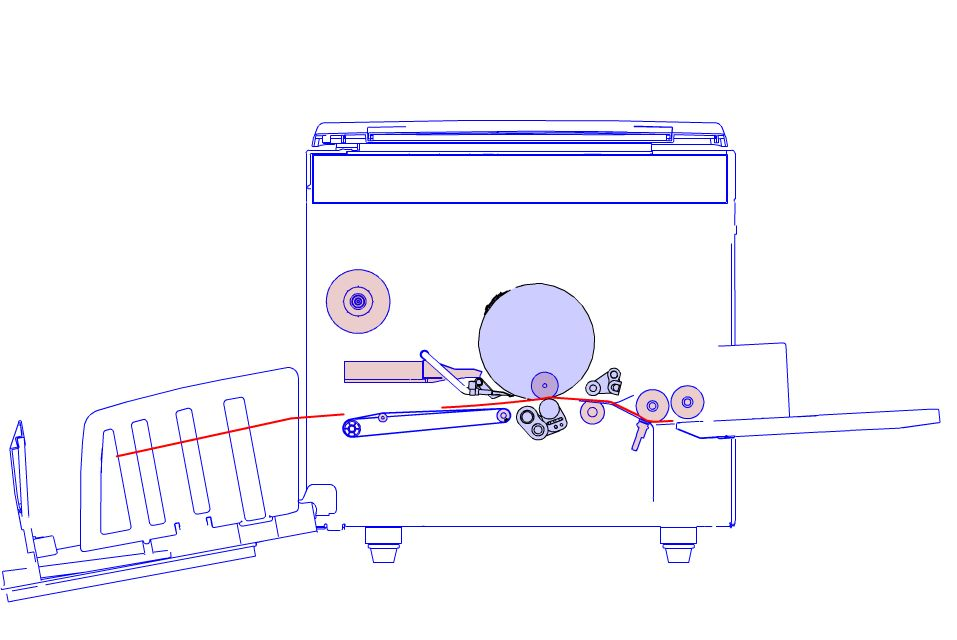
Diagram of internal mechanism and paper flow in a Risograph

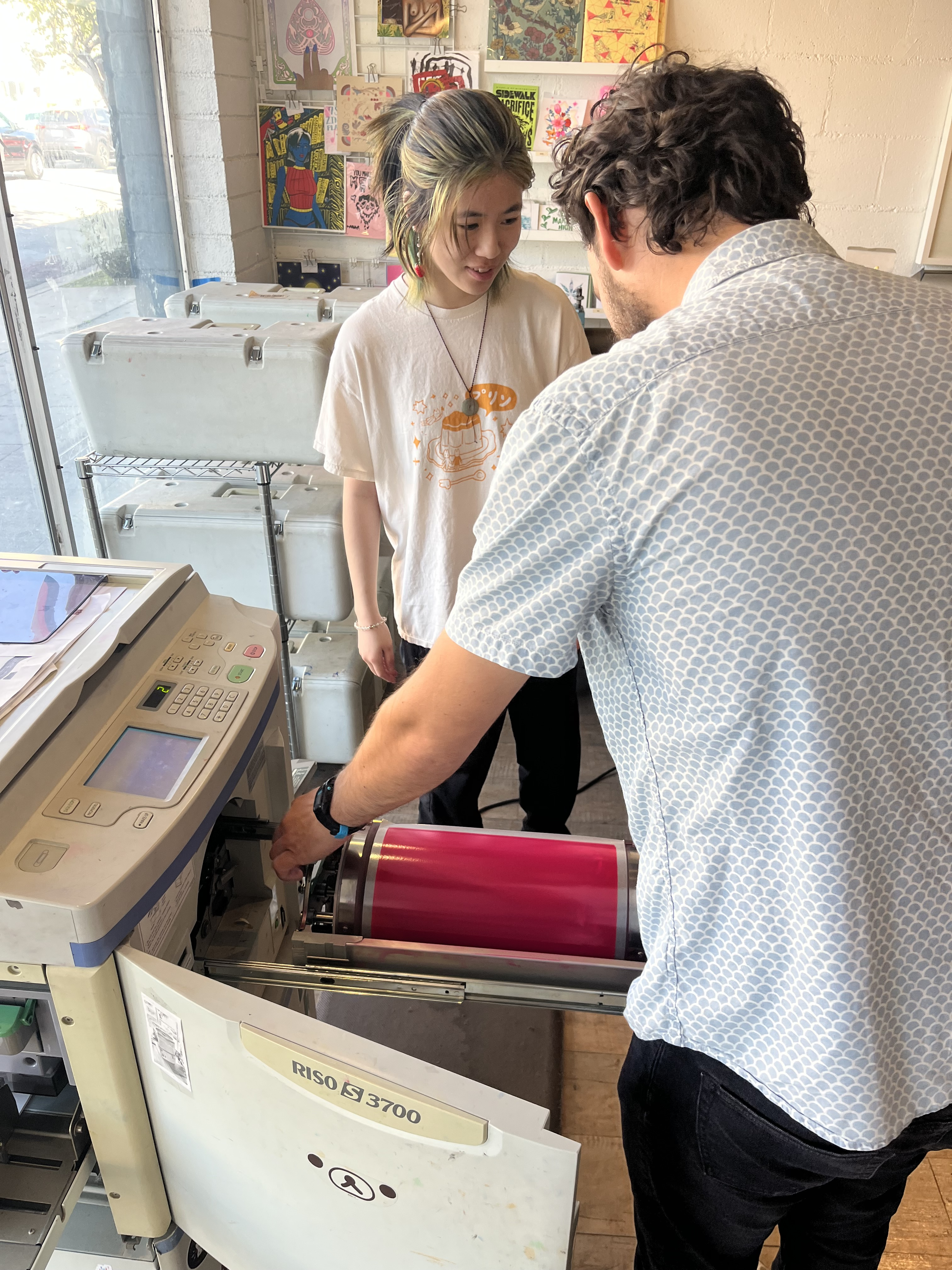
Changing out the ink drum of a Riso S-3700

The underlying technology is very similar to a mimeograph. It brings together several processes which were previously carried out manually, for example using the Riso Print Gocco system or the Gestetner system. It is commonly referred to as a mix between silkscreen and a photocopier, or as an automated silkcreen printer.

=== Ink ===
Because the process involves traditional ink like in offset printing, it does not require heat to fix the image on the paper with toner that a photocopier or laser printer does.

Risograph printers use a soy ink made from vegetable soybean oil. Soy ink is environmentally friendly and able to be created sustainably. Rice bran inks are also used.

One disadvantage of this soy based ink printing medium is that all paper stock has to be uncoated for the ink to dry and adhere properly. Paper type affects the texture of the final image and how the ink color looks and feels when dry. Due to the nature of the ink, the image will never be completely dry. Touching the ink while handling prints can lead to ink transferring onto one's hand, leaving an oily residue. This could result in leaving ink smudges, finger print marks, and light spots where ink was lifted.

The ink is translucent and can be layered on top of each other at different opacities to create unique hues. Specialty colors are also available, including fluorescent and metallic inks. Large areas in a design can be quickly printed due to the use of spot colors, as opposed to process color.

Ink colors are assigned to individual ink drums and are refilled by inserting an ink tube, or cartridge. Colors cannot be mixed or transferred without hacking. Newer machines have an RFID sticker on the ink tube that must correspond with the ink drum, and older machines have a physical mechanical piece that presses buttons inside the drum to identify the color.

A full master disposal tray in the Riso GR3750

Risograph MH9450 with front panel open

=== Making a master stencil ===
To make a master, the original image is scanned or sent from a computer, depending on the Risograph model. The master, or stencil, is created by making microscopic holes in the thin paper of the master with thermal heads. This master is then wrapped around the ink drum and the ink is pushed through the voids in the master. When creating a new master, the old master already wrapped around the drum from the previous print job is mechanically removed by the machine and placed in a master disposal tray to be emptied later. The new master is then placed around the ink drum for the current job.

When creating the master, the original image can be processed in two different textures––screen covered, resembling halftone dots, or grain touch. Depending on the type of machine, the image can also be processed using four different presets––photo (for images with a range grayscale values), line (for sharper black line art or text), duo (a mixture between the two), and pencil (for delicate textured lines). The image quality is less than that of offset printing, as text and images appear slightly fuzzy.

When making a master, the size of the image must fit on the size of the ink drum. The maximum printing area for ledger-sized is 291 mm x 425 mm (11 15/32 in x 16 23/32 in), A3-sized drums is 291 mm x 413 mm (11 15/32 in x 16 1/4 in), and letter-sized or A4-sized drums is 291 mm x 203 mm (11 15/32 in x 8 in).

=== Printing ===
After the master is made, the paper runs flat through the machine while the drum rotates at high speed to create each image on the paper. The paper is automatically feed into and ejected from the machine, through the paper feed tray and paper receiving tray. Risograph printers have manually interchangeable color inks drums allowing for printing in different colors or using spot color in a single print job.

To create a multi-colored print, the paper must be run through the machine multiple times. Some series models have two ink drums, thereby allowing two colors to be printed in one pass. Image color separations can be made using different techniques including spot color, monochrome, duotone, tritone/quadtone, or faux-CMYK, usually created on Photoshop. The individual ink layers can be manually re-positioned to adjust proper alignment.

During the printing process, the paper can get stuck in the machine, including around the ink drum, at the paper feed tray, and the paper receiving tray. The print quality can be affected by the paper type. Recommended paper weight is 46 g/m^{2} to 210 g/m^{2} (12 lb bond to 116 lb index).

==== Common print errors ====
- Roller Marks
- Misregistration
- Needle Marks
- Smudges
- Print Marks

Printing art with a Risograph

== Use ==
For schools, clubs, churches, colleges, political campaigns, and other short-run print jobs, the Risograph bridges the gap between a standard photocopier (which is cheaper up to about 100 copies) and using an offset press (which is cheaper over about 10,000 copies). For a run of 100 to 500 prints, Risograph printing is an economical option.

=== Use in art ===
Risograph printing became popular among artists in the 2010s, particularly in the creation of zines, artist's books, and comics, due to the ability to create democratic multiples for a relatively affordable price.

It has gained a cult following in the art community. It is known for its distinctive look and unpredictable nature. The combination of analog and digital processes offers artists a tool to create art at a higher production scale but keep the handmade aspect. Because of the printing processes involved, resulting misregistration, uneven textures, and ink layering are embraced by artists.

The ability to print in specialty colors, such as fluorescent and metallic inks, offers the ability to make unique aesthetic choices at a smaller scale. Specialty colors not offered in inkjet or laser printers can be used in medium-sized print jobs without needing to use higher-production offset printing or labor-intensive silkscreen printing.

Inside of Risograph machine

Select independent publishers and creative studios include Printed Matter, Inc., SVA Risolab, Secret Riso Club, Can Can Press, Risotto Studio, Colorama, Handsaw Press, Bad Student, Studio Fidéle, Hasuriso, Risolve Studio, Duplikat Press, Wedogood, and Jumbo Press. Risograph studios are found globally, with the majority in Europe and North America. Artist's book fairs are held internationally frequently, bringing together independent publishers and creative studios, many of whom produce work using Risograph printing.

Many studios offer DIY printing or contract print jobs to offset the cost of the printer, including ink and master rolls, and invest into purchasing new colors and supplies. Because the means of production is owned by small publishers and creative studios themselves, small print runs and projects can be realized. The Risograph offers creatives a way to self-publish in their own spaces and encourages collaboration and community inherent in shared studios.

Spectrolite is a Risograph color separation and image processing tool developed by ANEMONE and used by artists.

== Manufacture ==
The key master-making thermal head component is manufactured by Toshiba. Machines similar to Risographs are manufactured by Ricoh, Gestetner, Rex Rotary, Nashuatec and Duplo. Gestetner, Rex Rotary and Nashuatec are now owned by Ricoh.

== Printer Series ==
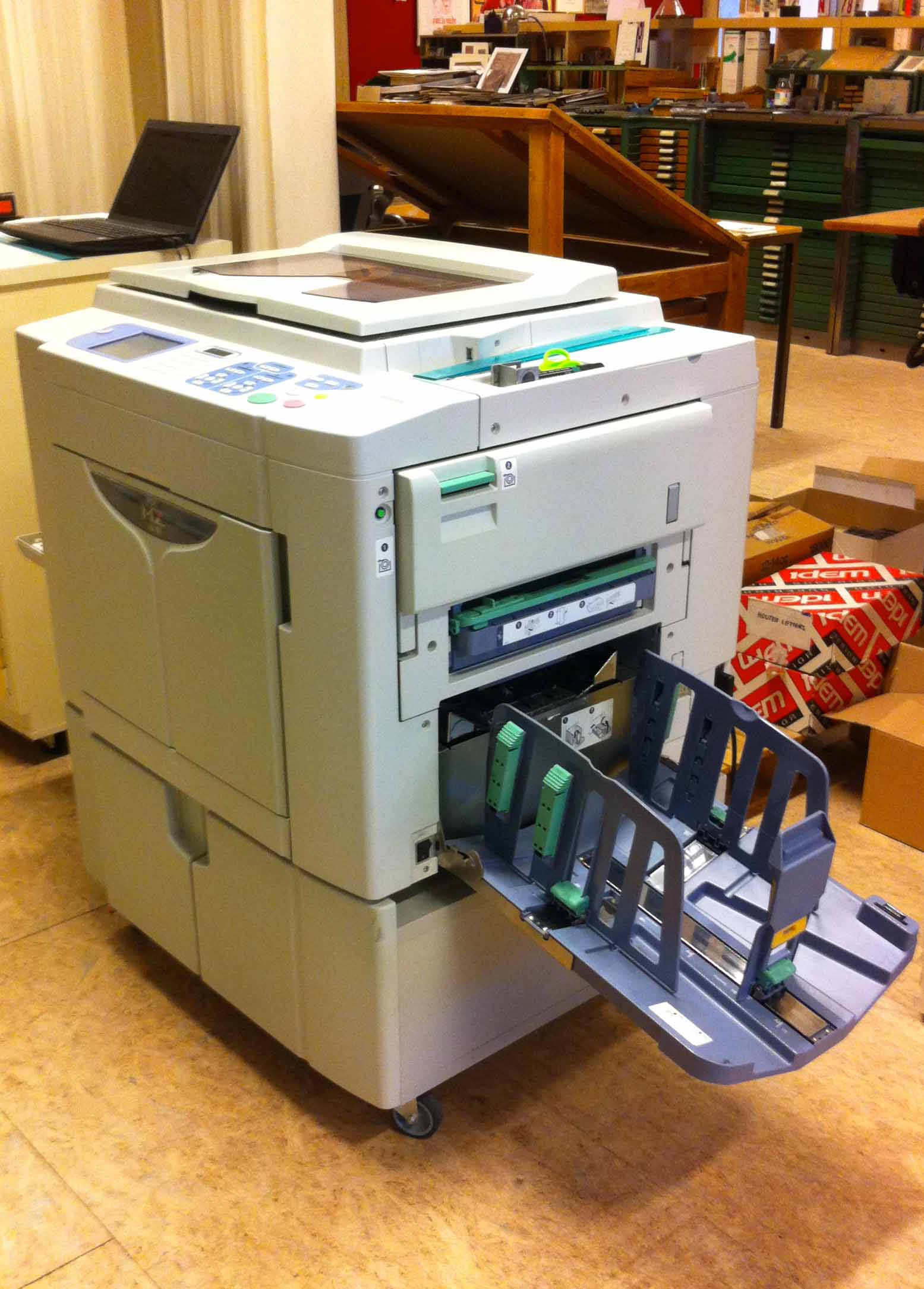
A MZ1070E Risograph

A GR1700 Risograph

A list of the Risograph printer series:

=== E series ===
- EV
- EZ

=== F series ===
- FR

=== G series ===
- GR

=== M series ===
- MD
- ME
- MF
- MH
- MV
- MZ

=== R series ===
- RA
- RC
- RN
- RP
- RV
- RZ

=== S series ===
- SE
- SF

== Ink Colors ==
The ink colors used in Risograph printing include:

An orange Risograph ink drum in protective case

Ink transfer from Fluorescent Pink master to Yellow master on Riso MH9450

=== Standard inks ===
- Black
- Blue
- Bright Red
- Brown
- Burgundy
- Flat Gold
- Fluorescent Pink
- Green
- Hunter
- Light Gray
- Marine Red
- Medium Blue
- Orange
- Purple
- Red
- Riso-Federal Blue
- Teal
- Violet
- Yellow

=== Special edition inks ===
- Apricot
- Bisque
- Brick
- Bright Olive Green
- Bubblegum
- Charcoal
- Copper
- Cornflower
- Cranberry
- Crimson
- Dark Mauve
- Emerald
- Fluorescent Orange
- Forest
- Granite
- Grape
- Grass
- Gray
- Indigo
- Ivy
- Kelly Green
- Lagoon
- Lake
- Light Lime
- Light Mauve
- Light Teal
- Mahogany
- Maroon
- Melon
- Metallic Gold
- Midnight
- Mist
- Moss
- Orchid
- Paprika
- Pine
- Plum
- Pumpkin
- Raisin
- Raspberry Red
- Scarlet
- Sea Blue
- Sea Foam
- Sky Blue
- Slate
- Smoky Teal
- Spruce
- Steel
- Sunflower
- Tomato
- Turquoise
- Wine

=== Custom inks ===
- Aqua
- Citron
- Clear Medium
- Coral
- Fluorescent Green
- Fluorescent Red
- Fluorescent Yellow
- Mint
- White

=== Unofficial inks ===
- Flamingo
- Flatallic Gold
- Metallic Silver

== See also ==
- Digital duplicator
- List of duplicating processes
- Mimeograph
- Print Gocco
