= Digital duplicator =

Printing technology

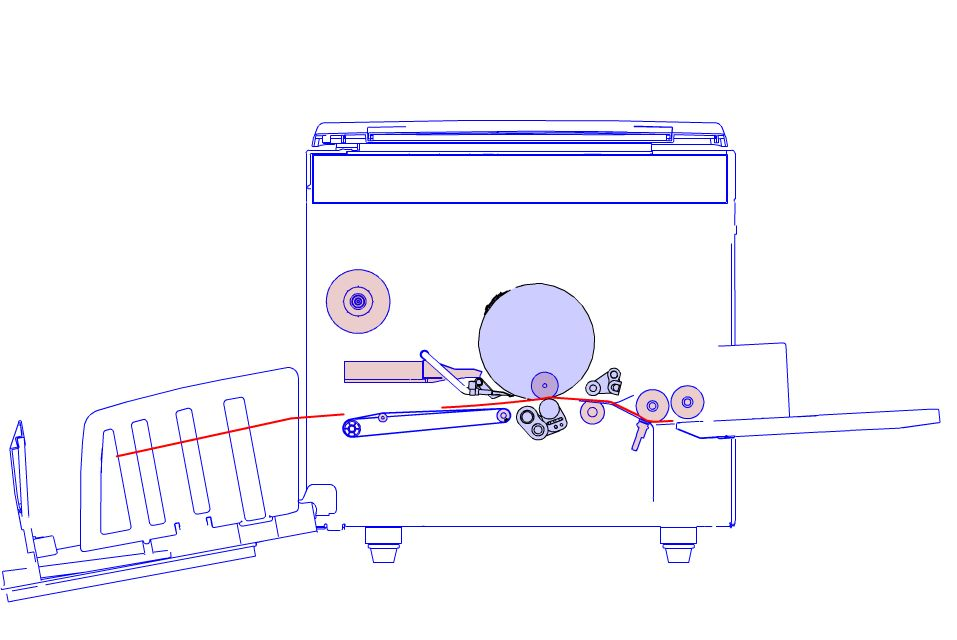
Diagram of internal mechanism and paper flow in a Risograph digital duplicator

A digital duplicator, also known as a printer-duplicator, is a printing technology designed for high-volume, repetitive print jobs (100 copies or more). Digital duplicators can provide a reliable and cost efficient alternative to toner-based copiers or offset printing equipment.

The digital duplicator begins either by transferring digitally or digitally scanning the original, and transferring it to a mask through a thermal imaging process. Then the mask is automatically wrapped around a print cylinder, where the ink is drawn through the perforations in the master creating the print.

Digital duplicators are known for their high speed in comparison to other printing methods. They are able to produce anywhere from 45 to 180 prints per minute, while maintaining a per page cost that can be as low as 1/3 of a cent. They are also considered reliable because they do not use heat or copier components, such as toner.

Risograph from Riso Kagaku Corporation is one of the brands of digital duplicator.

== See also ==
- Risograph
