= Marconi Transistorised Automatic Computer =

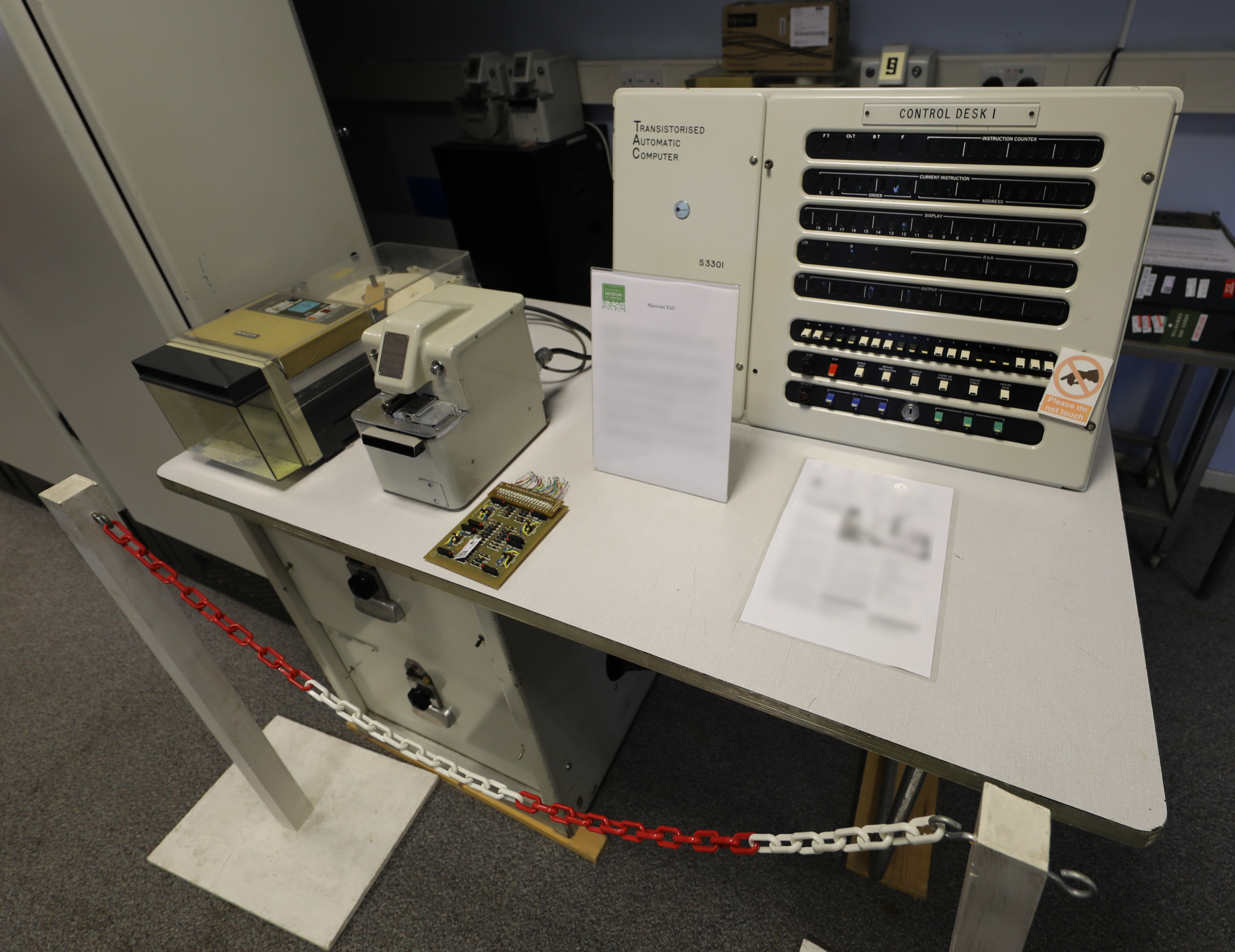
Marconi Transistorised Automatic Computer control desk

The Marconi Transistorized Automatic Computer was the first all-transistor computer built by Britain's Marconi Company. It was designed and manufactured from around 1959.

The computer employed germanium transistors which by this time were sufficiently reliable in room temperatures kept below about 23 degrees C. The type S3301 was a 500 kHz clocked, 20-bit word machine with two Mullard core memory stores providing 4k of 20-bit data. The internal CPU logic was synchronised to even and odd clock signals and special signals generated via microinstruction diode boards. The memory logic had slow and fast loops to speed the transfer of sequential data bursts. A facility was provided to microstep through instructions to help with fault-finding. Processor status bits were provided, with machine instructions being decoded from 6 bits in the current address memory word. Double word data had the most significant bit designated a sign bit, coded as binary fractions (-1 to +1), for the square root, multiply and divide instructions. The instruction set had the usual functions based on three registers named A, B and D (C was the current address in memory register, also called M). An additional instruction assisted with checksum calculation for data transferred to and from main data stores (viz. Sperry Rand magnetic drums).

Applications included its use for active Realtime Control, marking up radar screens with aircraft information and providing data processing for operators in a nuclear power station. Apart from transistor failure, other common faults included power supply capacitors 'drying out' resulting in excess ripple, and poor connections on the input/output highway. Paper tape peripherals had their own poor reliability, influenced to some degree of operator usage.

Surviving computers (ex power station) are on display at the National Museum of Computing (located at Bletchley Park) and Jim Austin's collection near the University of York. The National Museum system is operational. Copies of original manuals and documentation are at the Department of Computer Science, University of Manchester and the Manchester John Rylands Library. A performance summary specification is available online.

Marconi went on to develop the Myriad series of computers.
