= Kornel Ujejski Memorial =

1995 gunmetal sculpture in Szczecin, Poland

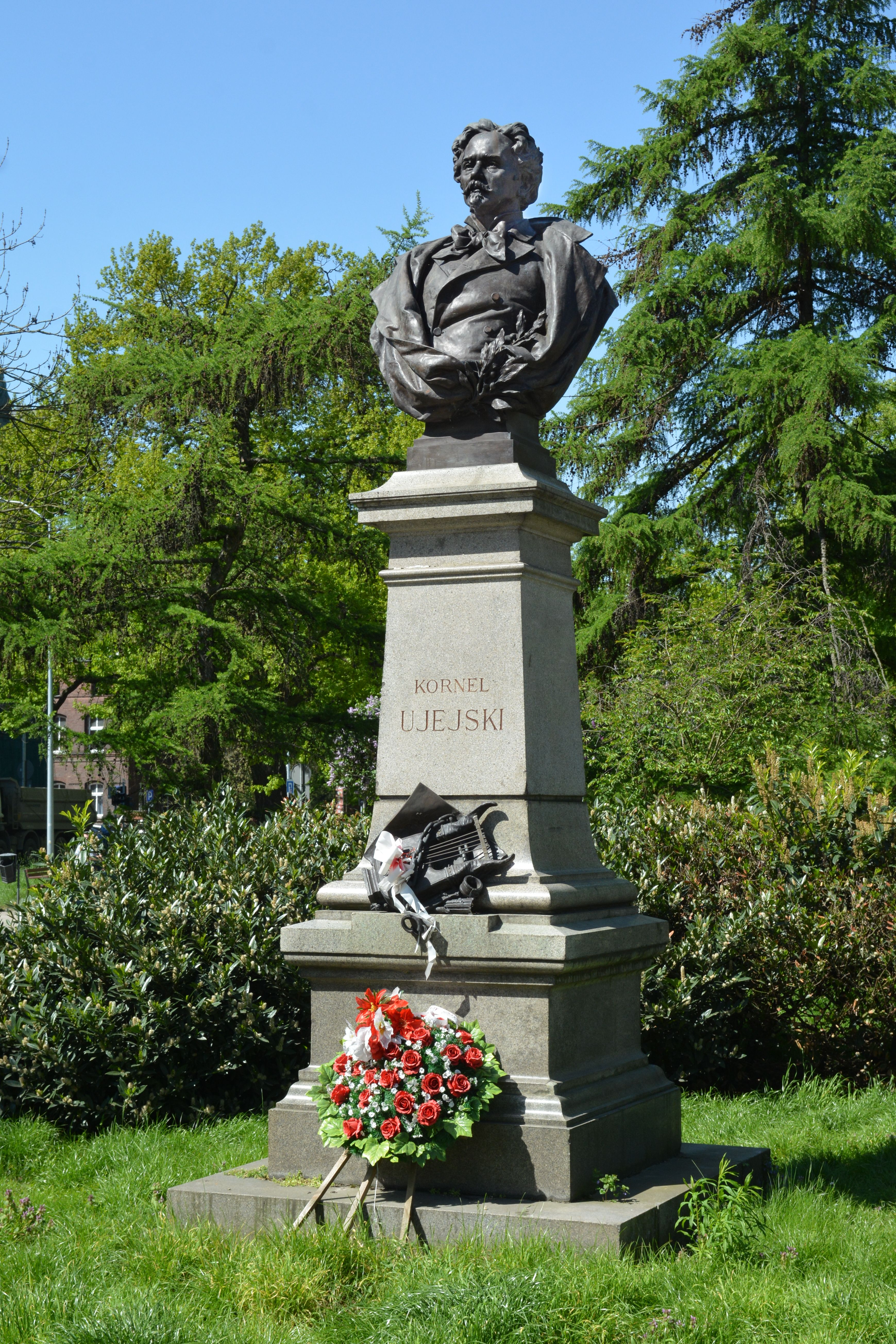
- The monument in 2024.
- Interactive map of Kornel Ujejski Memorial
- Location: Victory Square, New Town, Szczecin, Poland
- Coordinates: 53.425168°N 14.548609°E
- Designer: Antoni Popiel
- Type: Bust on a pedestal
- Material: Bronze (bust); granite (pedestal)
- Height: 4.2 m (14 ft)
- Opening date: 8 December 1901 (original location); 27 November 1956 (current location)
- Dedicated to: Kornel Ujejski

The Kornel Ujejski Memorial (Polish pronunciation: [ˈkɔr.nɛl uˈjɛj.ski]; Polish: Pomnik Kornela Ujejskiego; Ukrainian: Пам'ятник Корнелю Уєйському, romanized: Pam'yatnyk Kornelyu Uyeysʹkomu) is a monument in Szczecin, Poland, within the Downtown district. It is placed at the Victory Square, near the Harbour Gate, within the neighbourhood of New Town. It is dedicated to Kornel Ujejski (1823–1897), a 19th-century Romantic poet and political activist. The monument has a form of a bronze bust placed on a granite pedestal.

It was designed by Antoni Popiel, and originally unveiled in Lviv, then located in the Second Polish Republic, and now in Ukraine. The monument was placed in front of the City Cassino at 13 Shevchenko Avenue (then known as Academic Street), which is now occupied by the Lviv Regional Universal Scientific Library. The monument was taken down in 1946, and returned to Poland in 1950, where it was displayed in the Wilanów Garden in Warsaw until 1956. It was unveiled at the Victory Square on 27 November 1956. Originally, it was placed near the St. Adalbert Church, and was moved closer to the Harbour Gate in the 1970s.

== History ==
The monument was dedicated to Kornel Ujejski (1823–1897), a 19th-century Romantic poet and political activist, and was designed by sculptor Antoni Popiel. The sculpture was unveiled on 8 December 1901, in Lviv, then located in the Second Polish Republic, and now in Ukraine. It was placed in front of the City Cassino at 13 Shevchenko Avenue (then known as Academic Street). Currently, it is occupied by the Lviv Regional Universal Scientific Library.

The monument was taken down in 1946, and returned to Poland in 1950. Until 1956, it was displayed in the Wilanów Garden in Warsaw. Afterwards, it was moved to Szczecin and unveiled on 27 November 1956, at the Victory Square, in front of the St. Adalbert Church. In the 1970s it was moved slightly to the east, closer to the Harbour Gate. The monument was renovated in 1994. To celebrate the 105th anniversary of the sculpture, it was commemorated in a festivity on 9 December 2006, treated like an unveiling ceremony.

== Characteristics ==
The monument consists of a bronze bust of Kornel Ujejski, placed on a granite pedestal. It is decorated with a bronze sculpture of broken chains, wrapped around a torch, laurel wreath, and the first page of the 1846 musical composition "Chorał" by Józef Nikorowicz, for which Ujejski wrote lyrics in form of the 1847 song "Z dymem pożarów", which was considered as one of the national anthems of the Polish people in the 19th century. The pedestal is inscribed with text "Kornel Ujejski" in front, and "'Narodzie mój bądź szczęśliwy' K. Ujejski" in the back. The latter translates from Polish to "My nation, be happy".
