= Duplicating Machine Memorial =

Monument in Szczecin, Poland

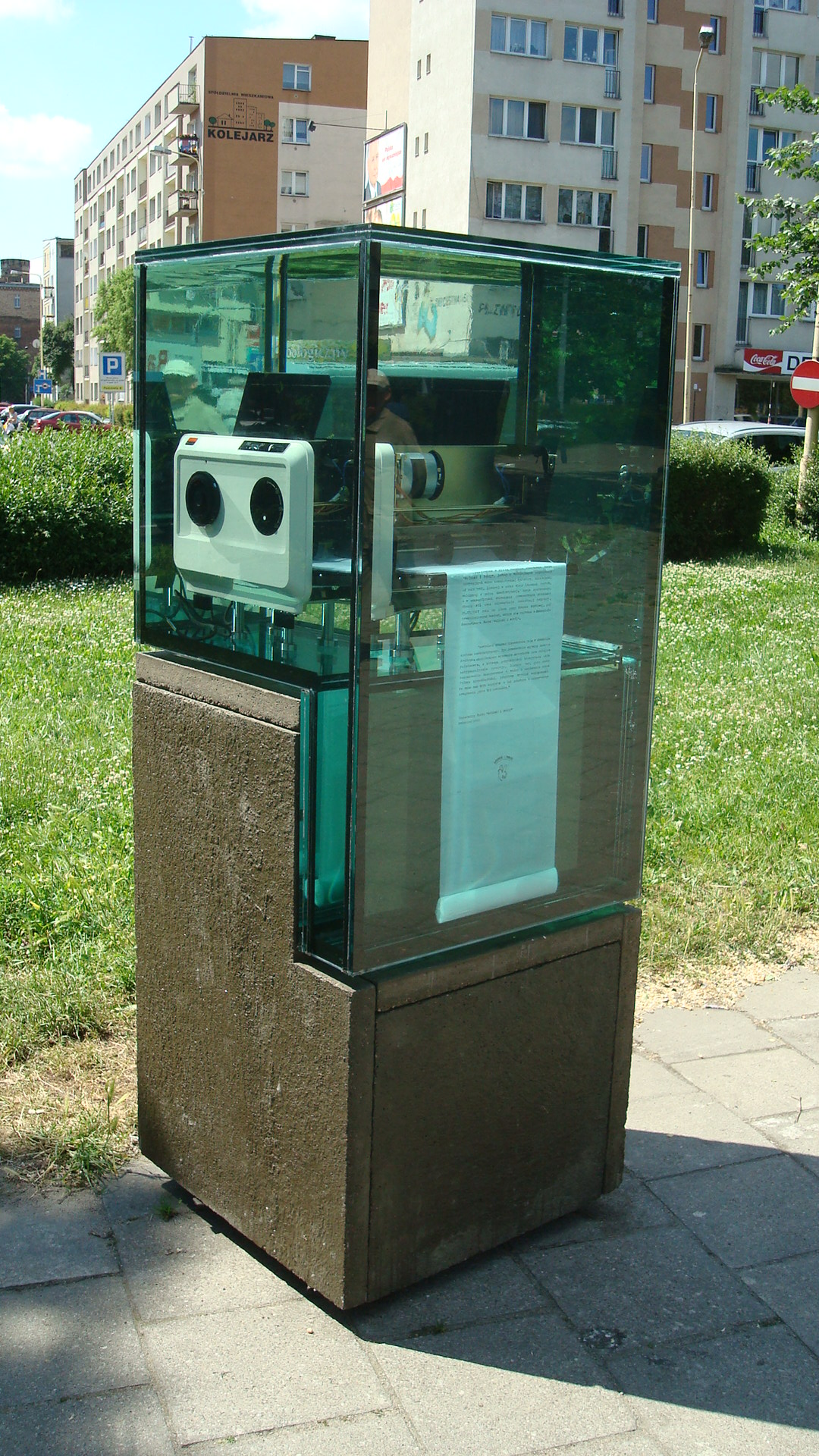
- The monument in 2010
- Interactive map of Duplicating Machine Memorial
- Location: Victory Square, Szczecin, Poland
- Coordinates: 53°25′30.3″N 14°32′56.4″E
- Designer: Dorota Tołłoczko-Femerling
- Type: Monument
- Material: Glycerol, metal, cloth, glass, concrete
- Length: 0.7 m (2 ft 4 in)
- Width: 0.7 m (2 ft 4 in)
- Height: 1.79 m (5 ft 10 in)
- Opening date: 12 June 2010

The Duplicating Machine Memorial (Polish: Pomnik Powielacza) is a monument in Szczecin, Poland, placed at the Victory Square, within the neighbourhood of New Town. Placed in 2010, it commemorates the 25th anniversary of the founding of the Freedom and Peace Movement, a dissident organization operating in opposition to the government of the Polish People's Republic from 1985 to 1992. It was founded following the protests opposing the arrest and imprisonment in Szczecin of Marek Adamkiewicz, a member of the Independent Students' Association, after he refused to serve in the military. The sculpture has the form of a spirit duplicator, a type of duplicating machine used by the organisation to print its publications, encased in a block of desiccated glycerol resin protected by glass panelling, and placed on a concrete pedestal. It was designed by Dorota Tołłoczko-Femerling, assembled by Piotr Pawelko, and unveiled on 12 June 2010.

== History ==
The monument commemorates the 25th anniversary of the founding of the Freedom and Peace Movement, a dissident organization operating in opposition to the government of the Polish People's Republic from 1985 to 1992. It was founded following the protests opposing the arrest and imprisonment in Szczecin of Marek Adamkiewicz, a member of the Independent Students' Association, after he refused to serve in the military. The monument was proposed by Bartosz Sawicki, a former member of the Freedom and Peace Movement, and designed by sculptor Dorota Tołłoczko-Femerling. The project envisioned encasing of a spirit duplicator, a type of duplicating machine used by the organisation to print its publications, which one source says is "immersed in a preservative fluid (glycerine)". The sculpture was assembled by Piotr Pawelko. It was unveiled on 12 June 2010, at the Victory Square near the Harbour Gate, where the members of the Freedom and Peace Movement held its first protest in the city on 20 March 1987. It was originally placed to be moved to the northern corner of the Victory Square and Independence Avenue, where the Freedom and Peace Movement would also gather for protests in the past.

== Design ==
The main element of the sculpture is a spirit duplicator, a type of duplicating machine in a glycerin liquid preservative, within a glass casing. It is placed on a granite pedestal. The monument has a shape of a rectangular cuboid, with the height of 179 cm (70 in), and a square base with each side measuring 70 cm (28 in). The machine is partially disassembled revealing its interior, and has a long piece of fabric hanging from its printing mechanism. It features an inscription in Polish, which reads:

Polish inscription

„Pomnik” Powielacza...
...powstaje w 25-tą rocznicę utworzenia Ruchu „Wolność i Pokój”, jednej z ważniejszych organizacji opozycyjnych wobec komunistycznej dyktatury, działającej od roku 1985, łączącej w sobie wiele ideowych nurtów, walczącej o pełną demokratyzację życia społecznego, a w szczególności zniesienie powszechnego obowiązku obrony PRL oraz zaprzestanie dewastacji przyrody. W dniu 20.03.1987 roku przy Bramie Portowej pod proekologicznymi hasłami, odbyła się pierwsza w Szczecinie demonstracja Ruchu „Wolność i Pokój”. W latach następnych w tym miejscu odbywały się kolejne akcje protestacyjne Ruchu „Wolność i Pokój”.
Powielacz spirytusowy odegrał nieocenioną rolę w demontażu systemu komunistycznego. Był powszechnie wykorzystywaną maszyną drukarską umożliwiającą wydawanie materiałów poza obiegiem państwowym, z którego przydatności korzystała cała antypeerelowska opozycja. Dlatego też, jako osoby bezpośrednio zaangażowane w walkę o odzyskanie przez Polskę niepodległości, pragniemy wyrazić wdzięczność, że dane nam było korzystać z tak prostego i niezawodnego urządzenia jakim był powielacz spirytusowy.
Uczestnicy Ruchu „Wolność i Pokój”.

Translation:
English translation

The Duplicating Machine "Memorial"...
...was created in the 25th anniversary of the founding of the Freedom and Peace Movement, one of the largest oppositionist organisations against the communist dictatorship, operating from 1985, combining many ideological trends, fighting for the full democratisation of social life, and in particular the abolition of the universal obligation to defend the Polish People's Republic and the cessation of the devastation of nature. On 20 March 1987, the first protest of the Freedom and Peace Movement in Szczecin, was held next to the Harbour Gate. In the following years, the further protests of the Freedom and Peace Movement took place at this location.
The spirit duplicator played an invaluable role in the dismantling of the communist system. It was a widely used printing machine, enabling the publication of materials outside the state system, and its usefulness was utilised by the entire anti-communist opposition. Therefore, as individuals directly involved in the fight for the independence of Poland, we wish to express our gratitude for having been given the opportunity to use such a simple and reliable device as the spirit duplicator.
The members of the "Freedom and Peace" Movement.
