= Victory Square (Szczecin) =

Urban square in Szczecin, Poland

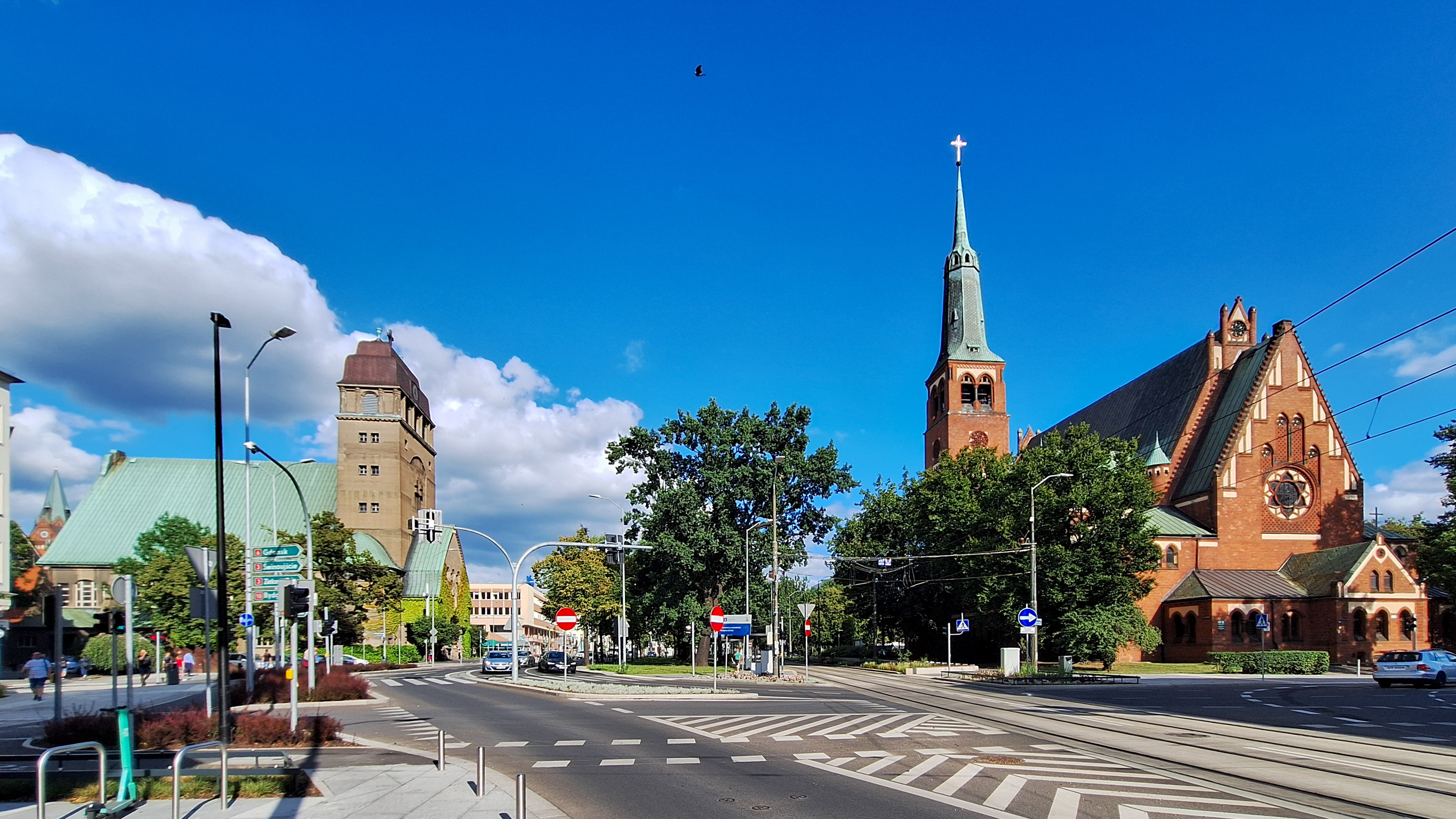
- The square as seen from Bolesław Wrymouth Street, with the St. Adalbert Church and the Church of the Holiest Heart of Our Lord.

- Location within Poland
- Former names: At the Berlin Gate (before 1927); Republic Square (1927–1933); Hohenzollern Square (1933–1945)
- Type: Urban square, roundabout
- Location: Szczecin, Poland
- Coordinates: 53°25′32.3″N 14°32′47.5″E
- North: Polish Armed Forces Avenue; Stanisław Więckowski Street; St. Adalbert Street; Kashubian Streets
- East: Independence Avenue; Stefan Wyszyński Street
- South: Kashubian Street; Potulicka Street; Nicolaus Copernicus Street
- West: Bolesław Wrymouth Street

Construction
- Completion: 19th century

The Victory Square (Polish: Plac Zwycięstwa; German: Siegesplatz) is an urban square in Szczecin, Poland, within the Downtown district. It is located it the neighbourhood of New Town, and forms a roundabout, intersecting with Bolesław Wrymouth Street, Polish Armed Forces Avenue, Stanisław Więckowski Street, St. Adalbert Street, Kashubian Street, Independence Avenue, Stefan Wyszyński Street, Potulicka Street, and Nicolaus Copernicus Street. The square features the Harbour Gate, a historic Baroque city gate dating to 1727, the St. Adalbert Church, a Gothic Revival dating to 1909, functioning as the Roman Catholic garrison church for the soldiers of the Polish Armed Forces, and the Church of the Holiest Heart of Our Lord, a modernist church dating to 1919, with elements of the Baroque Revival and Romanesque Revival architecture. The square was developed in the 19th century, after the removal of the city fortifications in 1886.

== History ==
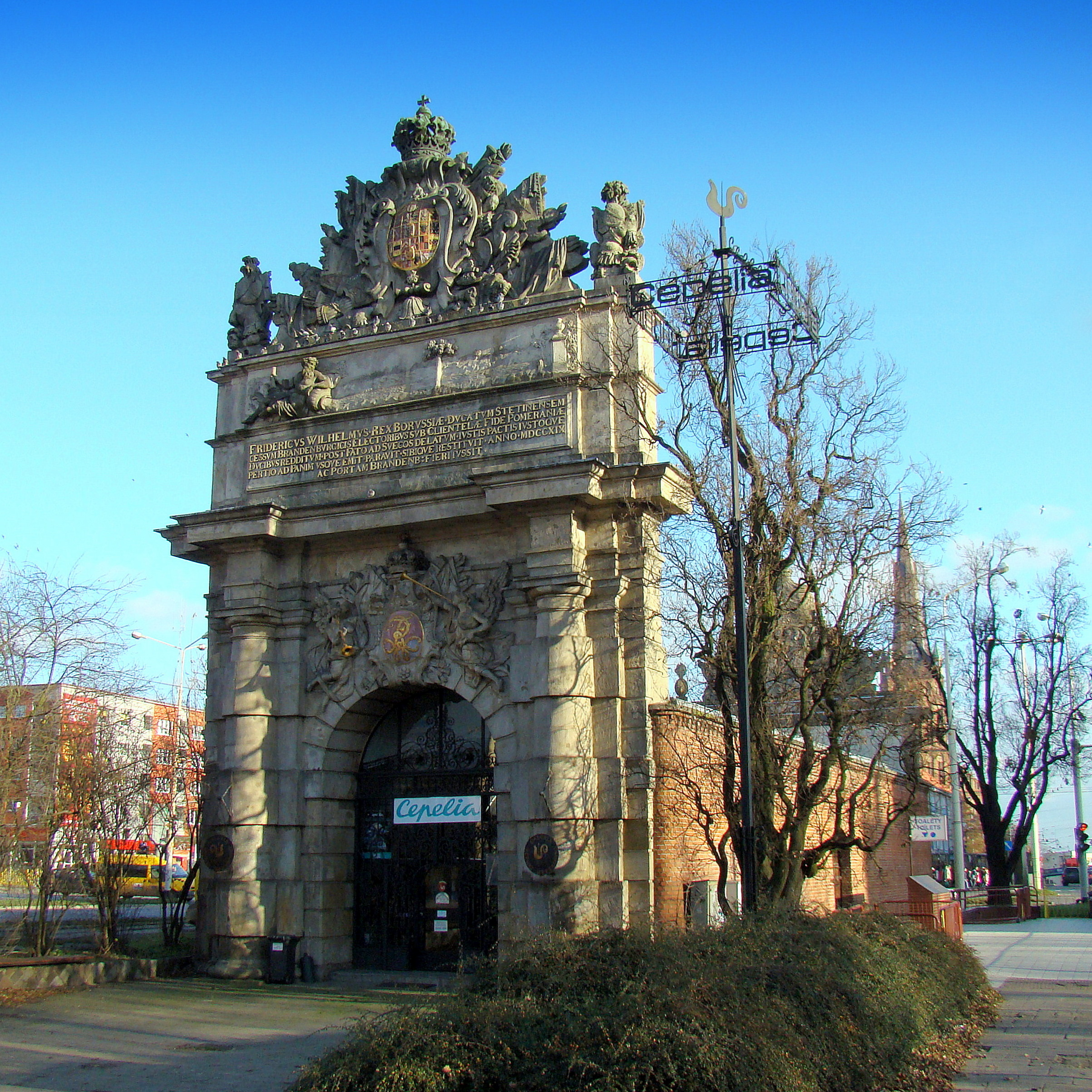
The Harbour Gate, a historic Baroque city gate, built in 1727.

From 1725 to 1727, the Harbour Gate was built in the Baroque style, at the entrance to the city, being attached to its fortification walls. It was protected by the nearby Royal and Passau bastions. The building was by military architect Gerhard Cornelius van Wallrawe, with the masonry done by Hans Jürgen Reinecke, and the façade sculptures by Bartholomé Damart. It was originally named the Brandenburg Gate, and was renamed to the Berlin Gate in 1732, as the road lead from it to the city of Berlin. It received its current name in 1945, commemorating the Allied victory in the Second World War. The Fort William was constructed to the northwest from the gate, between 1735 and 1741, as part of the city fortifications of the Szczecin Fortress. It was designed by Gerhard Cornelius van Wallrawe.

In 1846, on the premises of the Fort William, was founded a cemetery for its soldiers. It was originally referred to as the Garnison Churchyard (German: Garnison Kirchhof), and later became known as the Old Military Cemetery (German: Alter Militärfriedhof, Alter Militär Kirchhof). It reached to the future boundary of the Victory Square.

The fortification walls were removed in 1873, with the gate being preserved, and given under the city administration. The Fort William was also demolished in 1886. Following this, the tenement houses begun being constructed buildings in the area, together with an urban square, developed in front of the Harbour Gate, on the axis of Hohenzollern Street, now known as Bolesław Wrymouth Street. The square was originally known as At the Berlin Gate (German: Am Berliner Tor; Polish: Przy Bramie Berlinskiej), and later as the Republic Square (German: Platz der Republik; Polish: Plac Republiki) from 1927 to 1933, and the Hohenzollern Square (German: Hohenzollernplatz; Polish: Plac Hohenzollernów) from 1933 to 1945. The latter name was given in honor of the House of Hohenzollern, a historical royal dynasty, which members ruled Brandenburg, Prussia, and the German Empire.

In 1902, the Amphitrite Fountain sculptured by Reinhold Felderhoff, was placed in front of the eastern side of the gate, which was by this point bricked up. The sculpture depicted Amphitrite, goddess of the sea in the Greek mythology, as a nude female figure, standing on a chariot drawn by two galloping horses. It was placed on top of a large shallow fountain basin. The nudity of the sculpture caused controversy and protests among some religious conservative women. The location of the fountain and its basin was deemed to interfere with the road traffic, and it was removed on 12 October 1932.

In 1904, a tram line was opened crossing the square, between the current Bolesław Wrymouth Street to the intersection of Independence Avenue and Wyszyński Street.

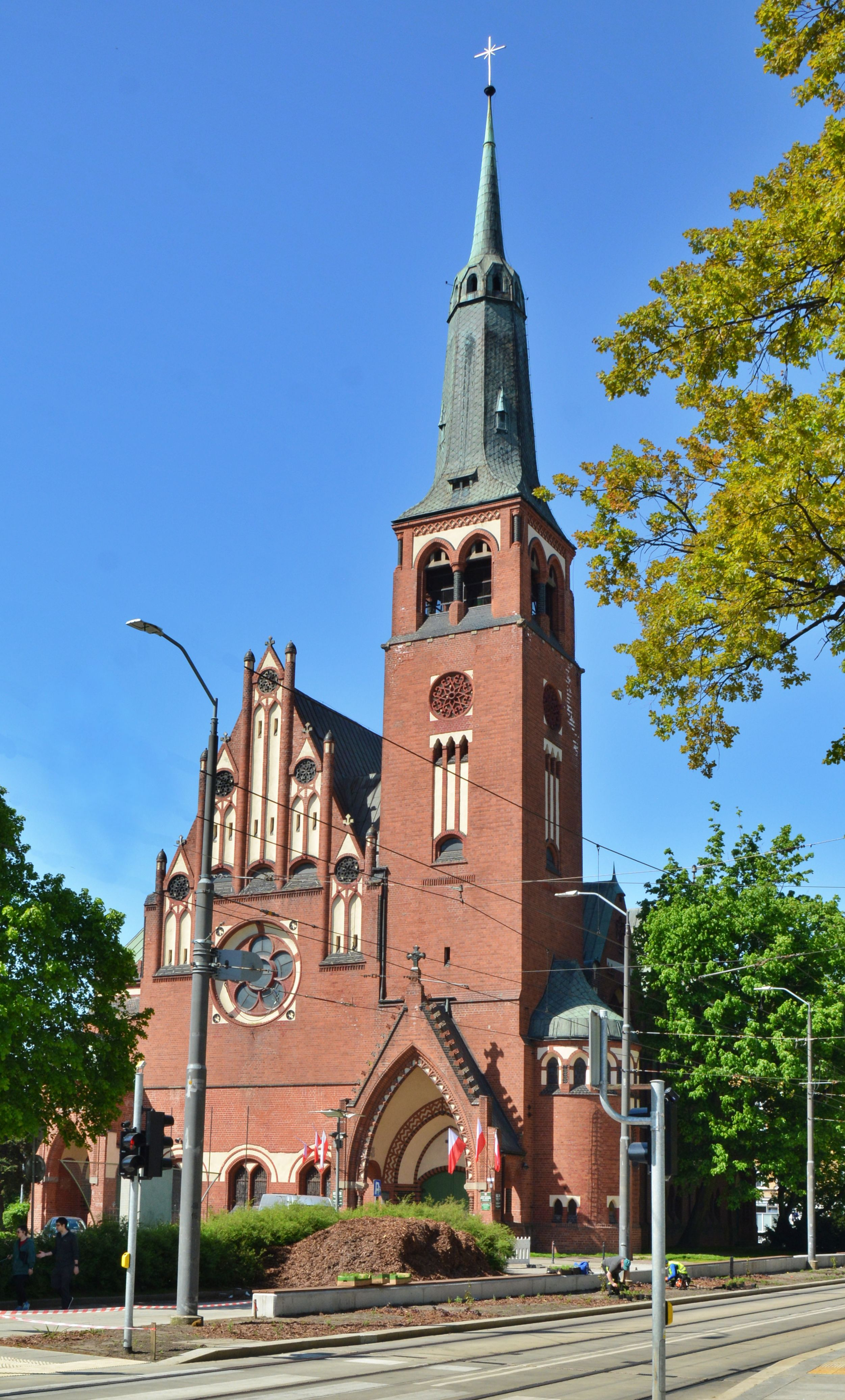
The St. Adalbert Church, a Gothic Revival Roman Catholic garrison church, built in 1909.

Between 1906 and 1909, the Bugenhagen Church was constructed at the western end of the square. Its was a parish church from the Lutheran denomination, and was designed in the Gothic Revival style by Jürgen Kröger.

The military cemetery was closed for new burials around the year 1900. In 1906, its southern portion was removed, to prepare the space for the construction of the Church of the Holiest Heart of Our Lord, which lasted from 1913 to 1919. It became a garrison church from the Lutheran denomination, serving the city garrison of the Reich Defence Forces. It was designed by Adolf Stahl in the modernist style with elements of the Baroque Revival and Romanesque Revival architecture. It was the first church in Germany build with the reinforced concrete.

In 1928, the shopping centre Familien Kaufhaus, owned by company DeFaKa, was opened at the corner of the Victory Square and Independence Avenue.

In 1942, during the Second World War, to protect the elaborate sculptures on the top of the Harbour Gate, from the Allied bombing raids, they were taken down, and hidden in the Arkona Woods. They were reinstalled in 1957. The building itself was covered in ivy to hide it.

After the war, the Church of the Holiest Heart of Our Lord became the first church to be reopened in the city, being adopted into a Roman Catholic civilian parish church. The Bugenhagen Church, being damaged during the war, was renovated and reopened in 1948, under the name St. Adalbert Church, becoming the new city garrison church for the soldiers of the Polish People's Army, replaced in 1989, by the Polish Armed Forces. In 1951, the Posejdon department store was built in place of Familien Kaufhaus.

On 27 November 1956, the Kornel Ujejski Memorial was unveiled at the square, near the St. Adalbert Church. The sculpture was designed by Antoni Popiel, and originally displayed in Lviv, Ukraine from 1901 to 1954, and later in Warsaw from 1950 to 1965. It is a monument dedicated to Kornel Ujejski (1823–1897), a 19th-century Romantic poet and political activist, and has a form of a bronze bust sculpture, placed on a granite pedestal. In the 1970s, it was moved closer to the Harbour Gate. To celebrate the 105th anniversary of the sculpture, it was commemorated in a festivity on 9 December 2006, treated like an unveiling ceremony.

In the 1970s, the layout of the tram tracks at the square was remodeled.

In 1997, the modernist fountain sculpture The Labyrinth was unveiled at the intersection of the Victory Square and the Polish Armed Forces Avenue. It was designed by Ryszard Wilk and built by Adam Jakubowski. It has a shape of a right triangular prism, and built from rows of hollowed clinker bricks covered in glass, forming the shapes of a woman, a tree, and a man. The sculpture originally functioned as a fountain, with the bricks being sprinkled with water, creating the visual effect of the rainbow. However, after three months, it suffered malfunction which could not been fixed, being turned off afterwards.

On 12 June 2010, the Duplicating Machine Memorial, designed by Dorota Tołłoczko-Femerling, was unveiled at the square, It commemorates the 25th anniversary of the founding of the Freedom and Peace Movement, a dissident organization operating in opposition to the government of the Polish People's Republic from 1985 to 1992, and its first protest in the city, held on 20 March 1987. The sculpture has a form of a spirit duplicator, a type of duplicating machine used by the organisation to print its publications, encased in a desiccated glycerol resin, and placed on a concrete pedestal.

In 2012, the Brama Portowa II modernist office building was opened at the corner of the Victory Square and Independence Avenue. Between 2016 and 2019, the former building of the Posejdon department store, which was closed down in 2009, was rebuilt into a modernist office building, named Posejdon Center.

Since 2015, the Harbour Gate is a theatre venue of the Szczecin Association of the Friends of Art.

== Characteristics ==
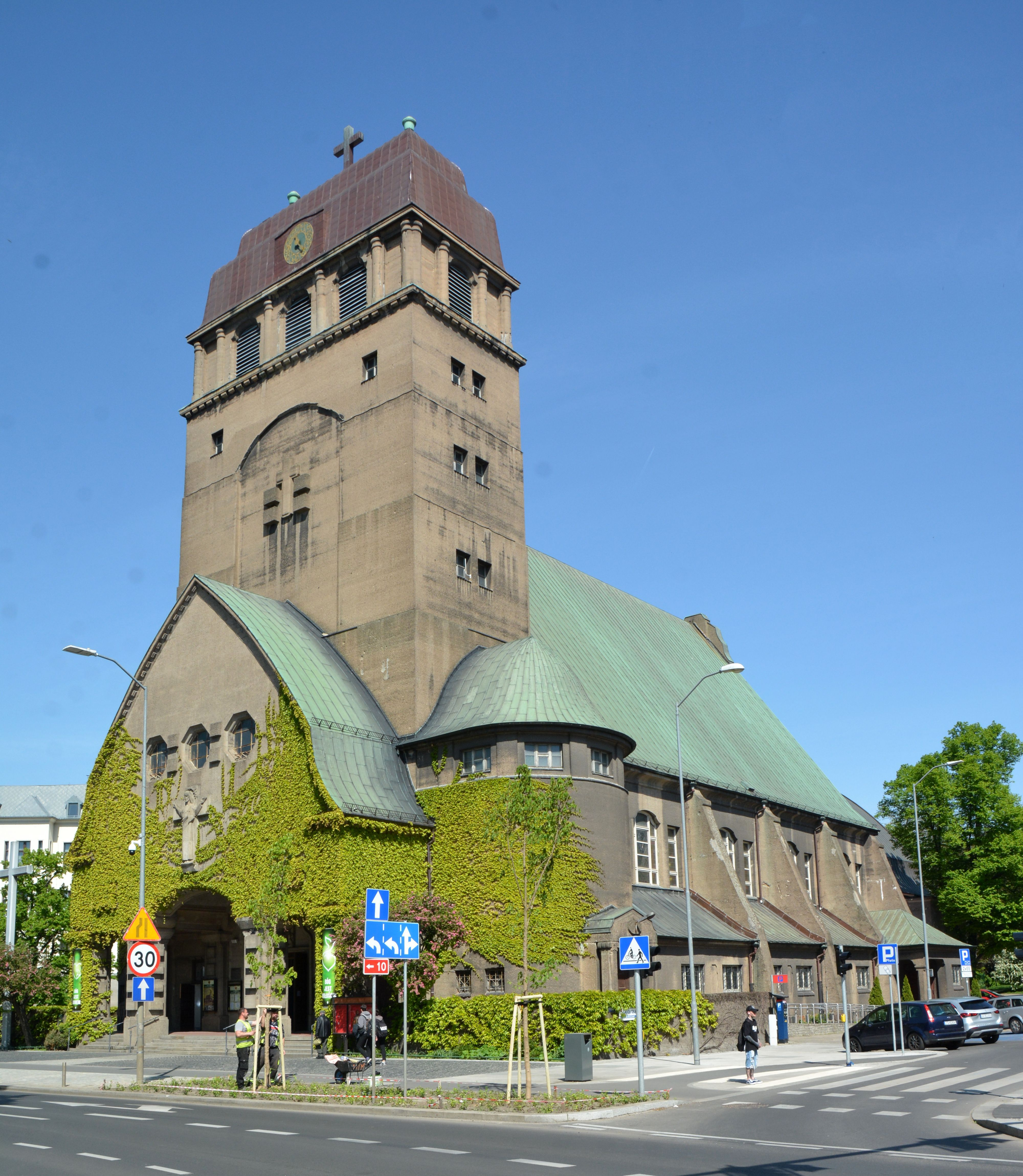
The Church of the Holiest Heart of Our Lord, a modernist Roman Catholic parish church, dating to 1919.

The square is located within the neighbourhood of New Town, and forms a roundabout, intersecting with Polish Armed Forces Avenue, Stanisław Więckowski Street, St. Adalbert Street, Kashubian Streets to the north, Independence Avenue, and Stefan Wyszyński Street to the east, Kashubian Street, Potulicka Street, and Nicolaus Copernicus Street to the south, and Bolesław Wrymouth Street to the west. The square is crossed by the tram line, with tracks between Bolesław Wrymouth Street to the intersection of Independence Avenue and Wyszyński Street. It features the trams stations Plac Zwycięstwa (Victory Square) and Brama Portowa (Harbour Gate).

In the east, the square features the Harbour Gate, a historic Baroque city gate dating to 1727. Currently, it is a theatre venue of the Szczecin Association of the Friends of Art. In the west, the square features the St. Adalbert Church, a Gothic Revival dating to 1909, functioning as the Roman Catholic garrison church for the soldiers of the Polish Armed Forces. The Church of the Holiest Heart of Our Lord, is placed to its north, between Stanisław Więckowski and St. Adalbert Streets. It is a modernist church dating to 1919, with elements of the Baroque Revival and Romanesque Revival architecture, and the reinforced concrete structure. It operates as a Roman Catholic civilian parish church. The square also includes the modernist office buildings of Brama Portowa II and Posejdon Center, located at the corner with Independence Avenue.

The square is decorated with three sculptures. In its east, it features the Kornel Ujejski Memorial, placed near the Harbour Gate. It is a monument dedicated to Kornel Ujejski (1823–1897), a 19th-century Romantic poet and political activist. The sculpture was designed by Antoni Popiel and originally unveiled in 1901, being moved to the square in 1956. It has a form of a bronze bust sculpture, placed on a granite pedestal. It its centre, the square includes the Duplicating Machine Memorial, designed by Dorota Tołłoczko-Femerling, and unveiled in 2010. It commemorates the 25th anniversary of the founding of the Freedom and Peace Movement, a dissident organization operating in opposition to the government of the Polish People's Republic from 1985 to 1992, and its first protest in the city, held on 20 March 1987. The sculpture has a form of a spirit duplicator, a type of duplicating machine used by the organisation to print its publications, encased in a desiccated glycerol resin, and placed on a concrete pedestal. In its northwest, the square features the modernist sculpture titled The Labyrinth, placed at the intersection of the Victory Square and Polish Armed Forces Avenue. It has a shape of a right triangular prism, and built from rows of hollowed clinker bricks covered in glass, forming the shapes of a woman, a tree, and a man. It was designed by Ryszard Wilk and built by Adam Jakubowski, and unveiled in 1997. The sculpture originally functioned as a fountain, with the bricks being sprinkled with water, creating the visual effect of the rainbow. However, after three months, it suffered malfunction which could not been fixed, being turned off afterwards.

== Gallery ==
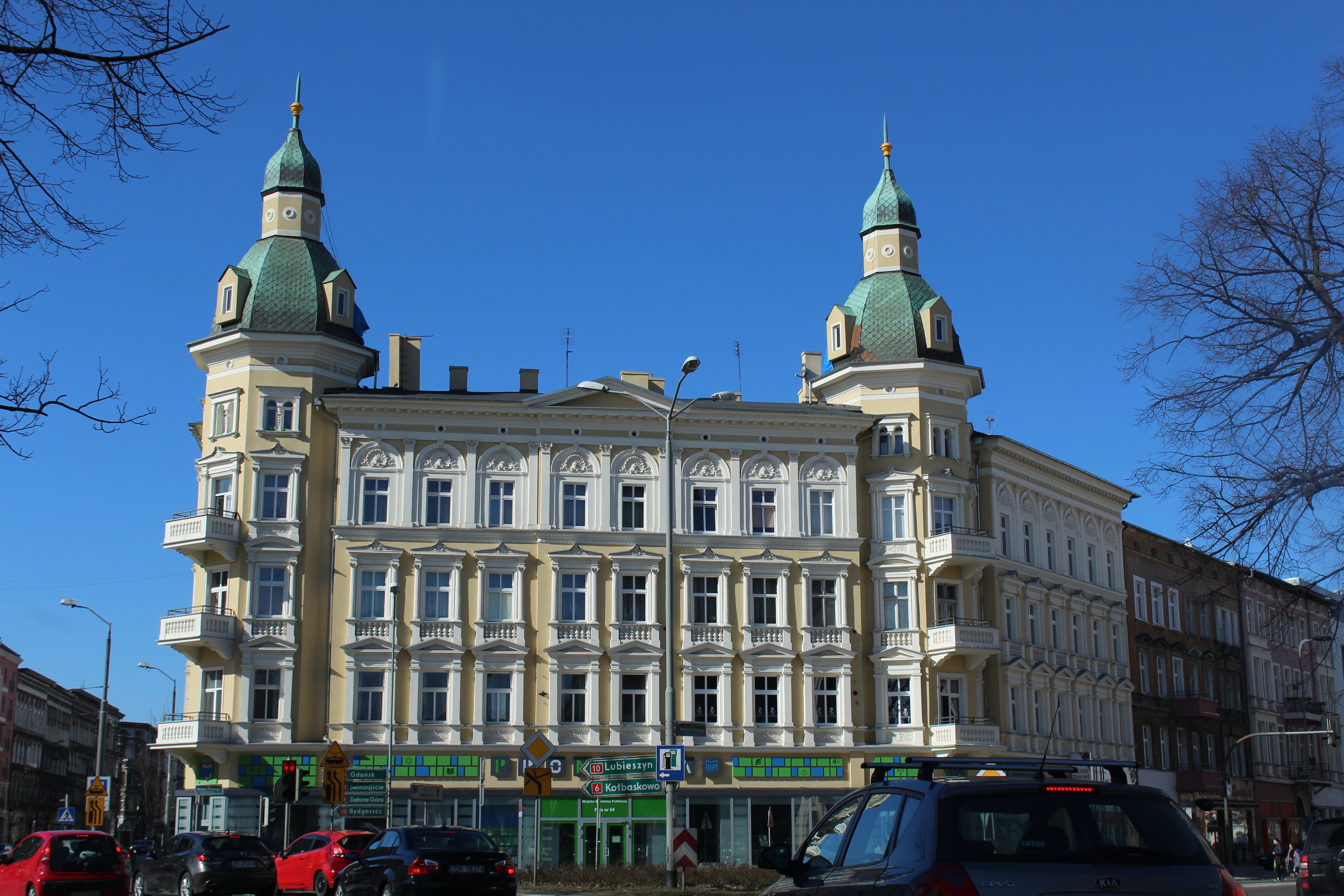
The tenement house at the corner with Bolesław Wrymouth Street and Polish Armed Forces Avenue.

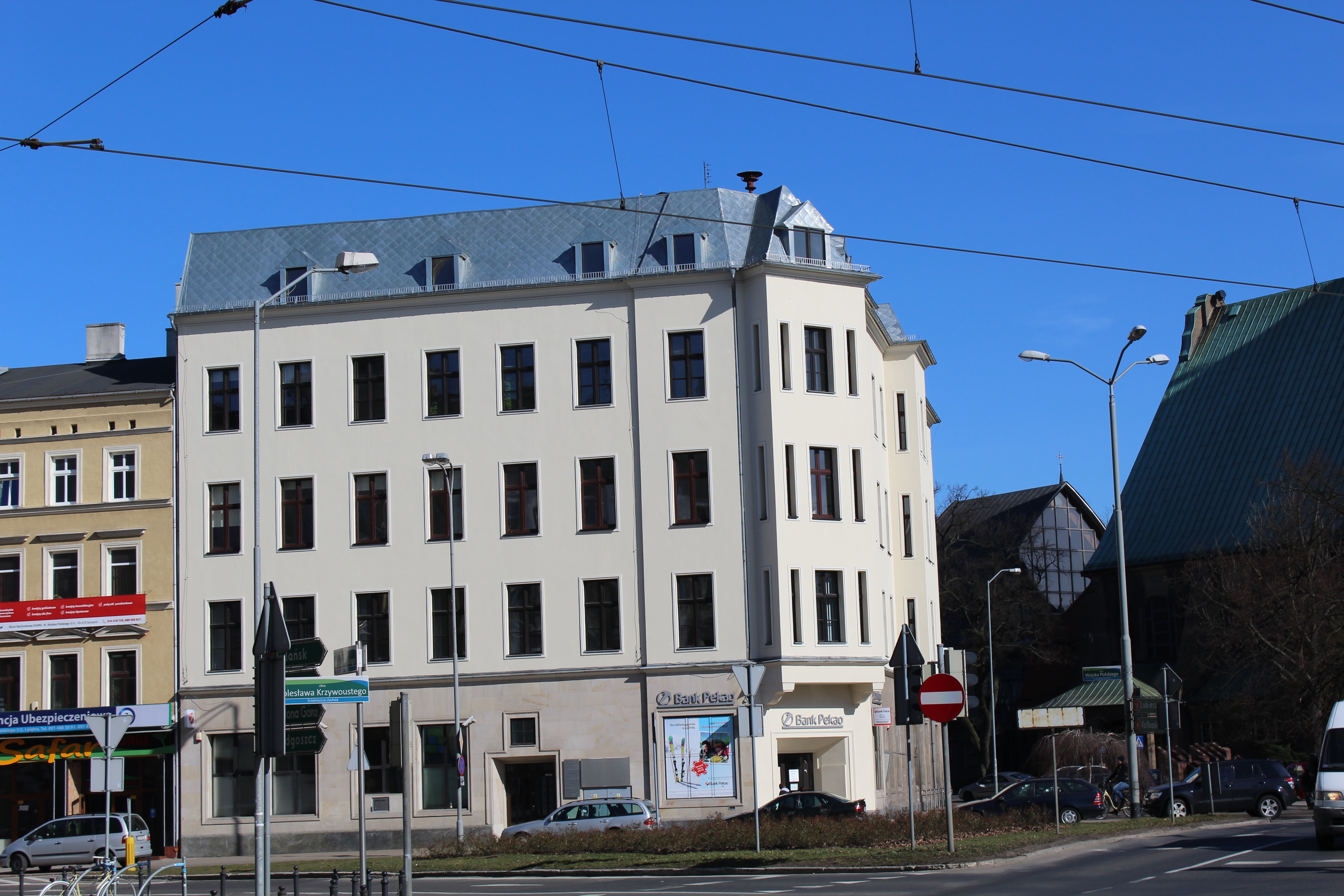
The historic tenement house, now a bank building, at the corner with Bolesław Wrymouth Street and Polish Armed Forces Avenue.

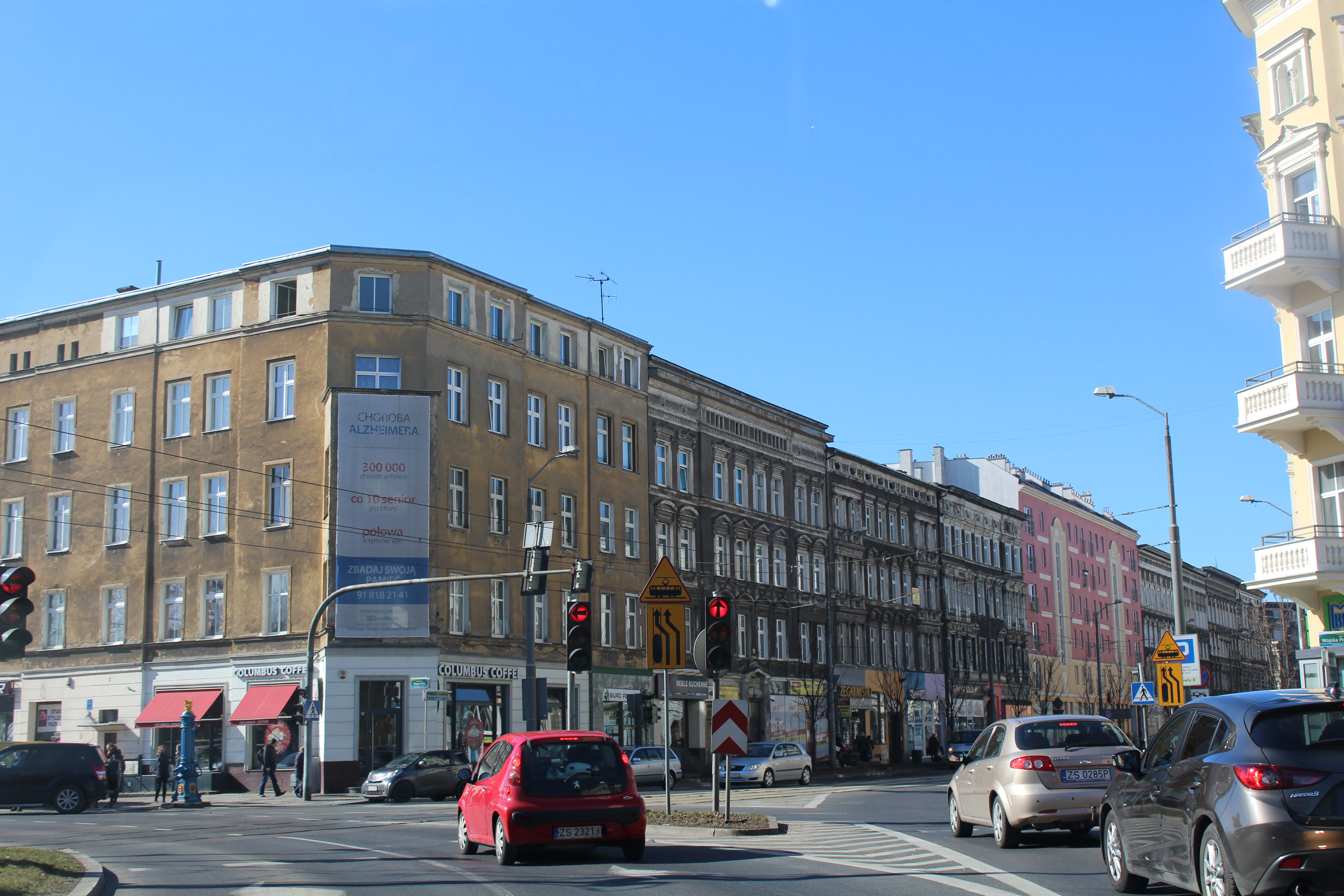
Tenement house at the corner with Nicolaus Copernicus Street.

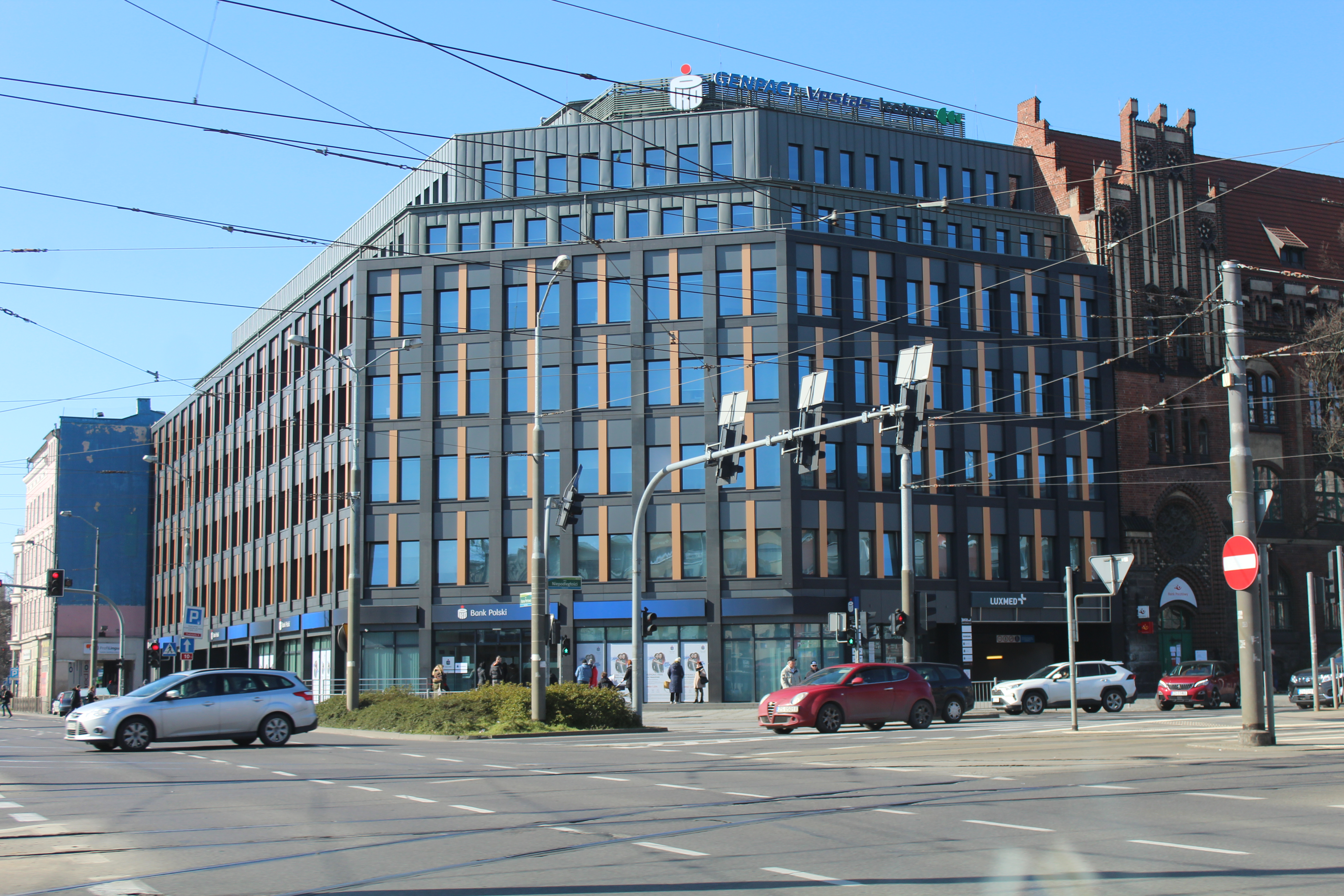
The modernist office building Brama Portowa II at the corner with Independence Avenue.

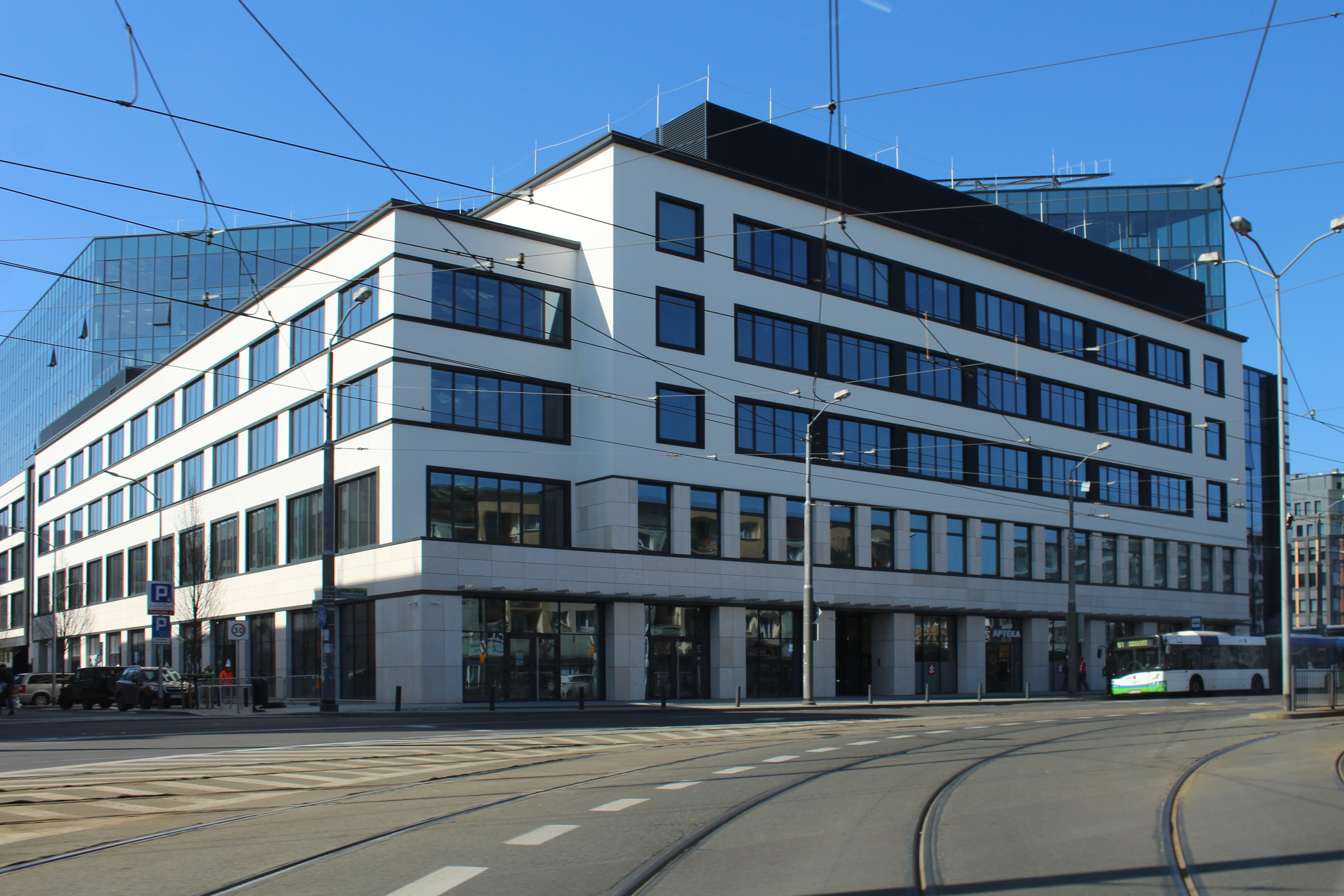
The modernist office building Posejdon Center at the corner with Independence Avenue.

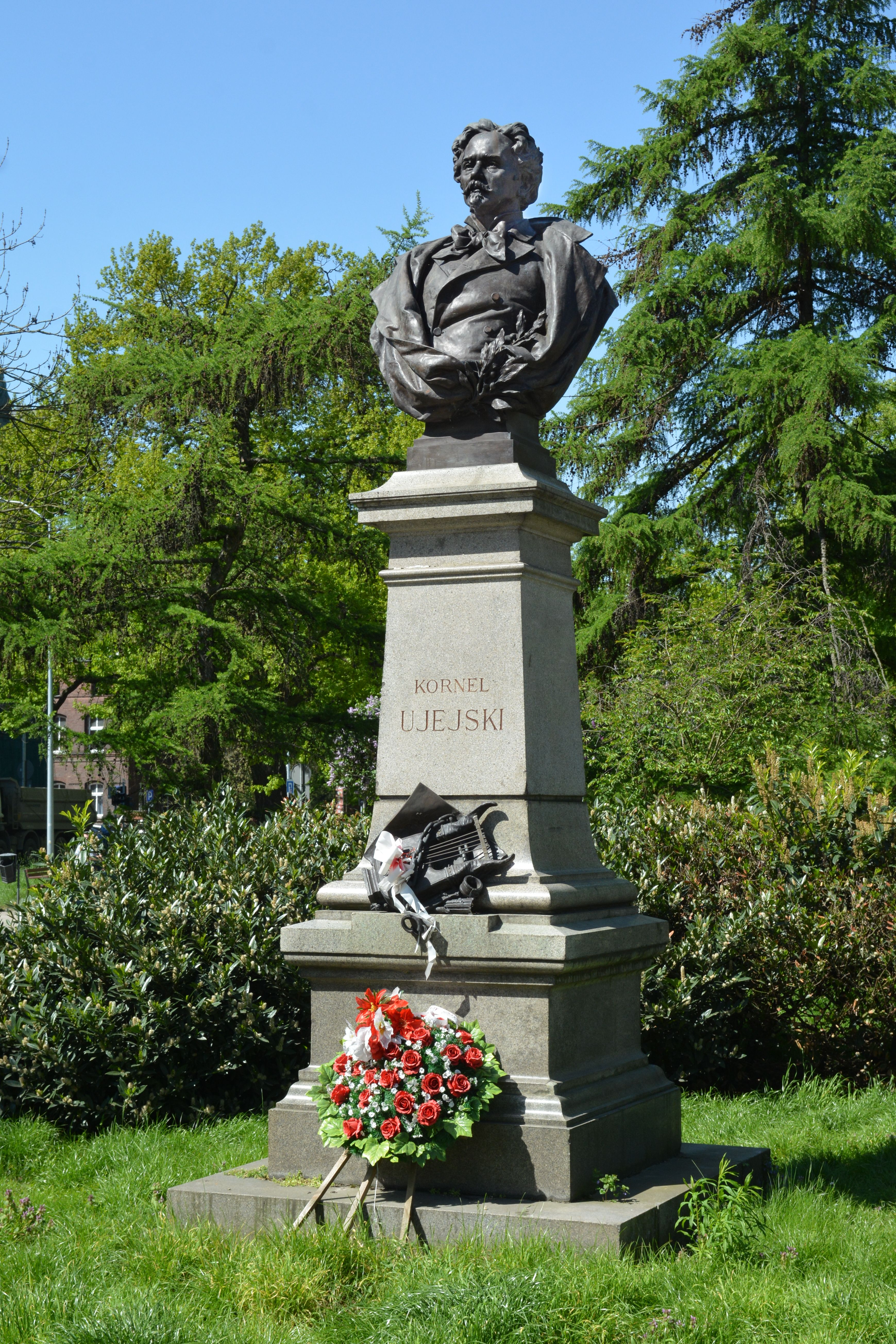
The Kornel Ujejski Memorial by Antoni Popiel.

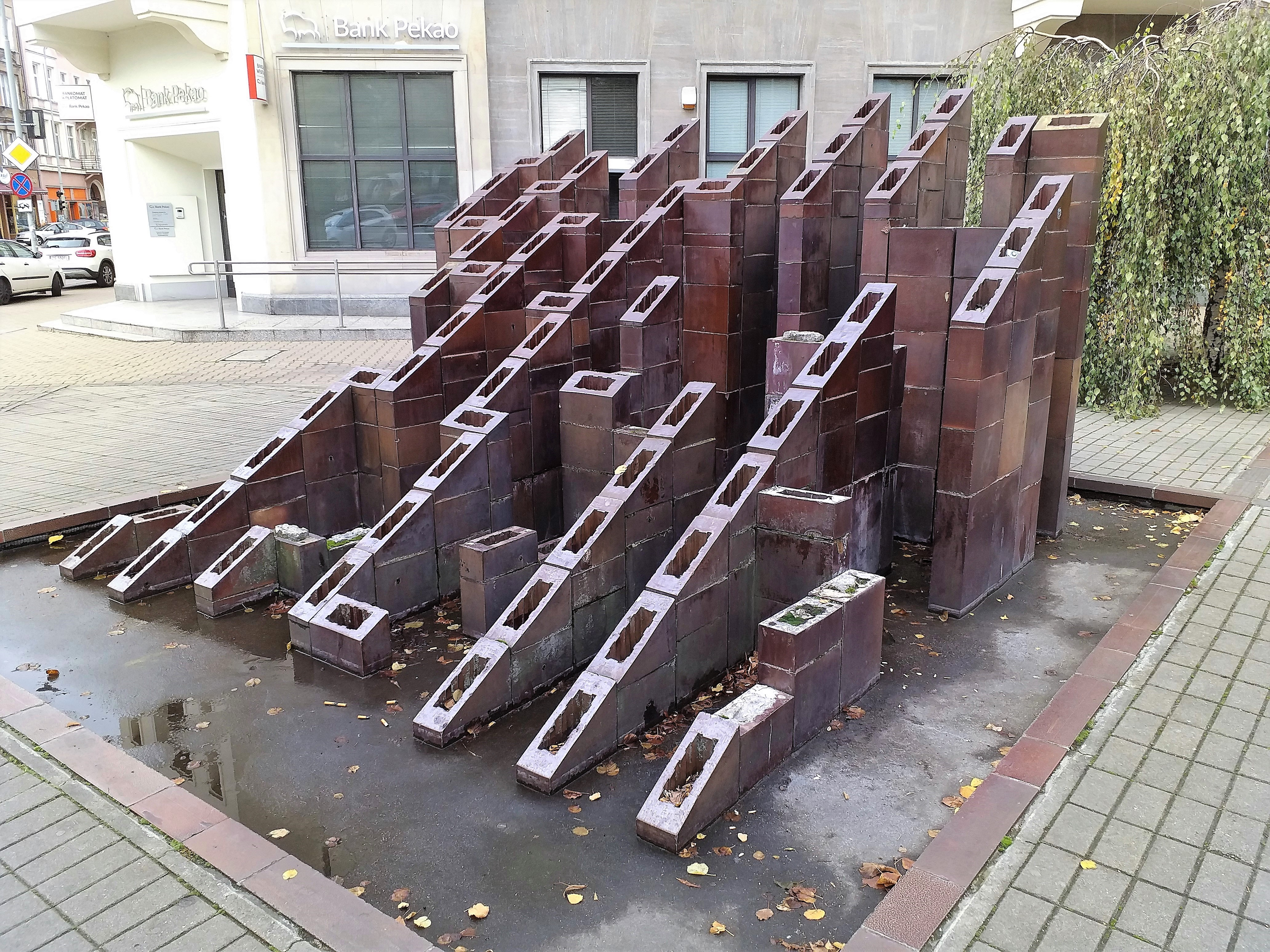
The sculpture The Labyrinth by Ryszard Wilk.

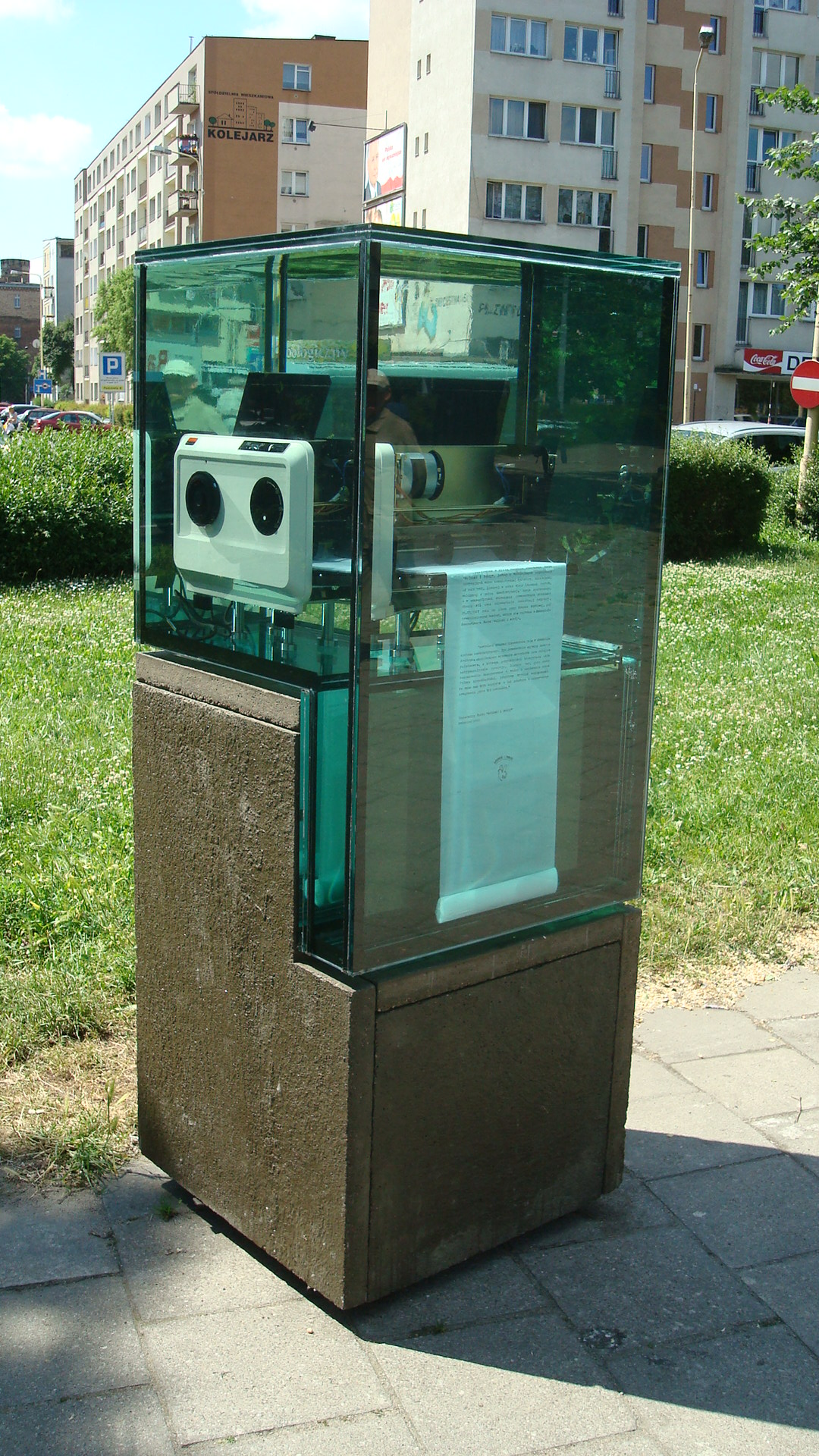
The Duplicating Machine Memorial by Dorota Tołłoczko-Fermeling.
