= Amphitrite Fountain =

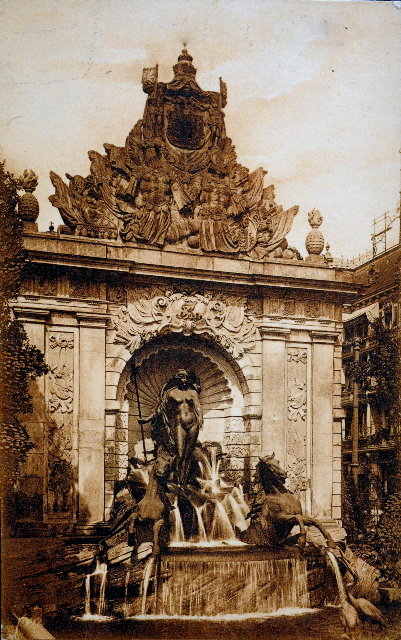
- The fountain sometime between 1902 and 1920.
- Interactive map of Amphitrite Fountain
- Location: Victory Square, Szczecin, Poland
- Coordinates: 53°25′30″N 14°33′00″E
- Designer: Reinhold Felderhoff
- Type: Fountain sculpture
- Material: Sandstone (probably)
- Opening date: 1902
- Dedicated to: Amphitrite
- Dismantled date: 12 October 1932
- Style: Baroque Revival

The Amphitrite Fountain (/ˌæm.fɪˈtɹaɪ.ti/; German: Amphitrite-Brunnen; Polish: Fontanna Amfitryty), also known as the statue of Amphitrite (Polish: Pomnik Amfitryty), and the Felderhoff Fountain (German pronunciation: [ˈfɛltɐˌhɔf]; German: Felderhoff-Brunnen; Polish: Fontanna Felderhoffa), was a Baroque Revival fountain sculpture in the city of Szczecin, Poland (then part of the German Empire), placed at the intersection of current Independence Avenue, Wyszyńskiego Street, and the Victory Square, in front of the Harbour Gate. Designed by Reinhold Felderhoff, it depicted Amphitrite, the goddess of the sea in the Greek mythology, as a nude female figure, standing on a chariot drawn by two galloping horses. It was unveiled in 1902, and removed in 1932, being moved to the Pomeranian State Museum (now Szczecin National Museum), from where it went missing. It is currently considered as a lost work of art.

== History ==
The fountain sculpture was carved by Reinhold Felderhoff, and unveiled in 1902, in front of the former bricked-up entrance to the Harbour Gate, at the intersection of current Independence Avenue, Wyszyńskiego Street, and the Victory Square. The sculpture, depicting a naked female figure, caused controversy and protests with groups of some religious and conservative women.

In 1929, the location of the fountain and its basin was deemed to interfere with the planned road construction, and it was removed on 12 October 1932. The sculpture was donated to the Pomeranian State Museum (now Szczecin National Museum), with its further whereabouts remaining unknown.

== Characteristics ==
The Baroque Revival sculpture took form of a statue Amphitrite, the goddess of the sea in Greek mythology, depicted as a nude female figure, holding a trident. She stood on a chariot, drawn by two galloping horses, faced towards the Oder river. The sculpture was most likely made from sandstone, and was inspired by the Apollo Fountain in the Palace of Versailles in France. The water flew from the chariot, and cascaded into a large shallow basin. It was placed in a niche of the eastern wall of the Harbour Gate, facing the intersection with the current Independence Avenue, Wyszyńskiego Street, and the Victory Square. After 1932, it was moved to the Pomeranian State Museum (now Szczecin National Museum), from where it went missing. It is currently considered as a lost work of art.
