= Spirit duplicator =

Obsolete printing technology

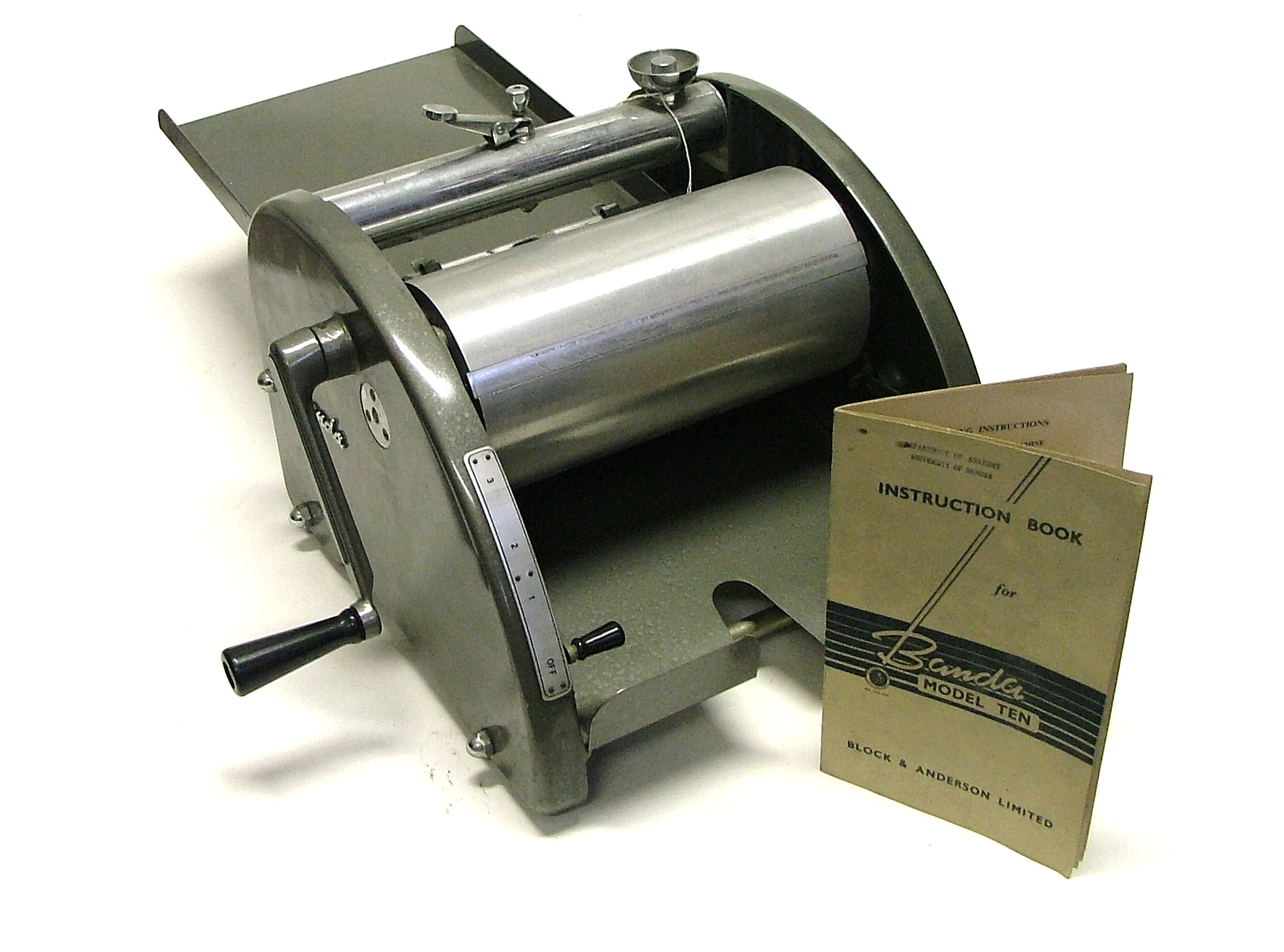
A spirit duplicator machine

A spirit duplicator (also Rexograph and Ditto machine in North America, Banda machine and Fordigraph machine in the U.K. and Australia) is a printer invented in 1923 by Wilhelm Ritzerfeld, which was used for most of the 20th century. "Spirit" here refers to the alcohols that were the principal solvents used in generating copies.

Spirit duplicators were used mainly by schools, churches, clubs, and other small organizations, such as in the production of fanzines, because of the limited number of copies one could make from an original, along with the low cost of copying.

The spirit duplicator was most popular in the same period as the mimeograph and the hectograph.

== History ==
The spirit duplicator was invented in Germany in 1923 by Wilhelm Ritzerfeld. The best-known manufacturer in the United States and the world was Ditto Corporation of Illinois. Copiers in the United Kingdom were commonly manufactured by Associated Automation Ltd of Willesden, London NW10, a subsidiary company of the computer makers Elliott-Automation Ltd for the Block & Anderson company, under their "Banda" brand. In both cases, the trademark became a generic name for both the copiers and the process in their respective markets.

The faintly sweet aroma of pages fresh off the duplicator was a feature of school life in the spirit-duplicator era.

== Design ==
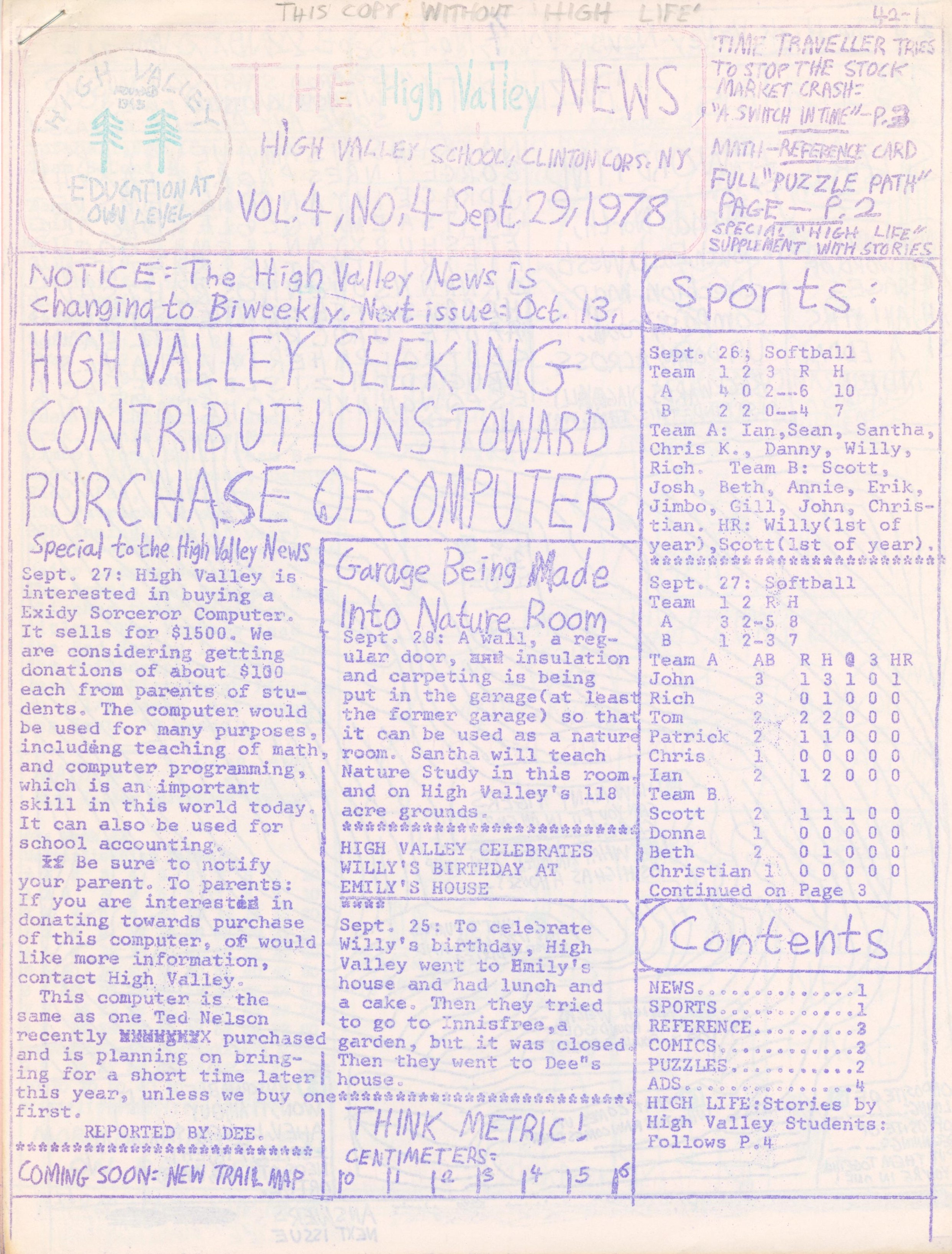
A school newspaper published using a ditto machine in 1978

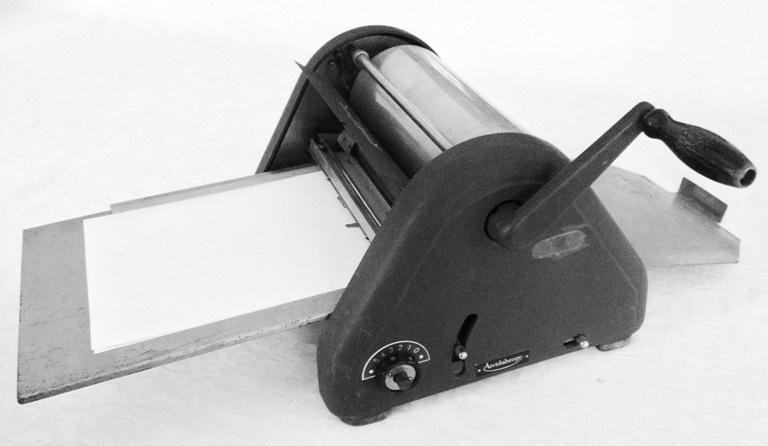
A hand-cranked spirit duplicator from the 1960s

The duplicator uses two-ply "spirit masters", also called "master sheets". The first sheet can be typed, drawn on, or written on. The second sheet is coated with a layer of wax that has been impregnated with one of a variety of colorants. The pressure of writing or typing on the first sheet transfers the colored wax from the second sheet to the shiny, coated back side of the first sheet, producing a mirror image. This produces the same result as a sheet of carbon paper put in backwards. The two sheets are then separated, and the first sheet is fastened to the machine drum with the back side facing out, serving as a printing plate.

There is no separate ink used in spirit duplication, as the wax transferred to the back side of the first sheet contains the ink. As the paper to be printed moves through the printer, the solvent is spread across each sheet by an absorbent wick. When the solvent-impregnated paper comes into contact with the back side of the first sheet, it dissolves just enough of the pigmented wax to print the image onto the paper as it goes under the printing drum. One master can produce 40 or so good copies; after that, the copies gradually become paler as the colored wax is used up.

The usual wax color was aniline purple (mauve), a cheap, moderately durable pigment that provided good contrast, but masters were also manufactured in red, green, blue, and black, as well as the hard-to-find orange, yellow, and brown. All except black reproduced in pastel shades: pink, mint, sky blue, and so on.

Spirit duplicators had the useful ability to print multiple colors in a single pass, which made them popular with cartoonists. Multi-colored designs could be made by swapping out the waxed second sheets; for instance, shading in only the red portion of an illustration while the top sheet was positioned over a red-waxed second sheet. This was possible because the duplicating fluid was not ink, but a clear solvent.

The duplicating fluid typically consisted mostly of methanol or ethanol, both of which were inexpensive and readily available in quantity, evaporated quickly, and would not wrinkle the paper. Sometimes small amounts of other solvents, such as Cellosolve, were added to improve image quality.

In 1938, a nonflammable solvent was invented by Johan Bjorksten to enable the use of electrically driven machines without concern for the flammability of pure methyl/ethyl alcohol. "A composition composed of 10% of trichlorofluoromethane and 90% of a mixture of 50% methyl alcohol, 40% ethyl alcohol, 5% water and 5% of ethylene glycol monoethyl ether. This solvent mixture is non-flammable in the closed space of the reservoir and has a flash point of 100 °F (38 °C) when fully exposed to air. The solvent mixture has a pleasant odor, reduced toxicity and gives at least as good copies as the duplication liquid before the addition of the trichlorofluoromethane. It is believed that the high efficiency of trichlorofluoromethane as a flame reducing agent is due to the fact that its boiling point is sufficiently low as to cause the formation of a non-flammable vapor film on the surface of the organic solvent, with sufficiently high boiling point as to be substantially retained by the solvents even at high summer temperatures."

== Durability ==
Copies made by spirit duplicator now pose a serious challenge to archivists responsible for the preservation of historical documents and art. Dittoed images gradually fade with exposure to ultraviolet light, limiting their usability for permanent labels and signage. Fluorescent lighting emits small amounts of ultraviolet light. When exposed to direct sunlight, ditto copies can fade to illegibility in less than a month. The low-quality paper often used would yellow and degrade due to residual acid in the untreated pulp. In the worst case, old copies can crumble into small particles when handled.

== Popular culture ==
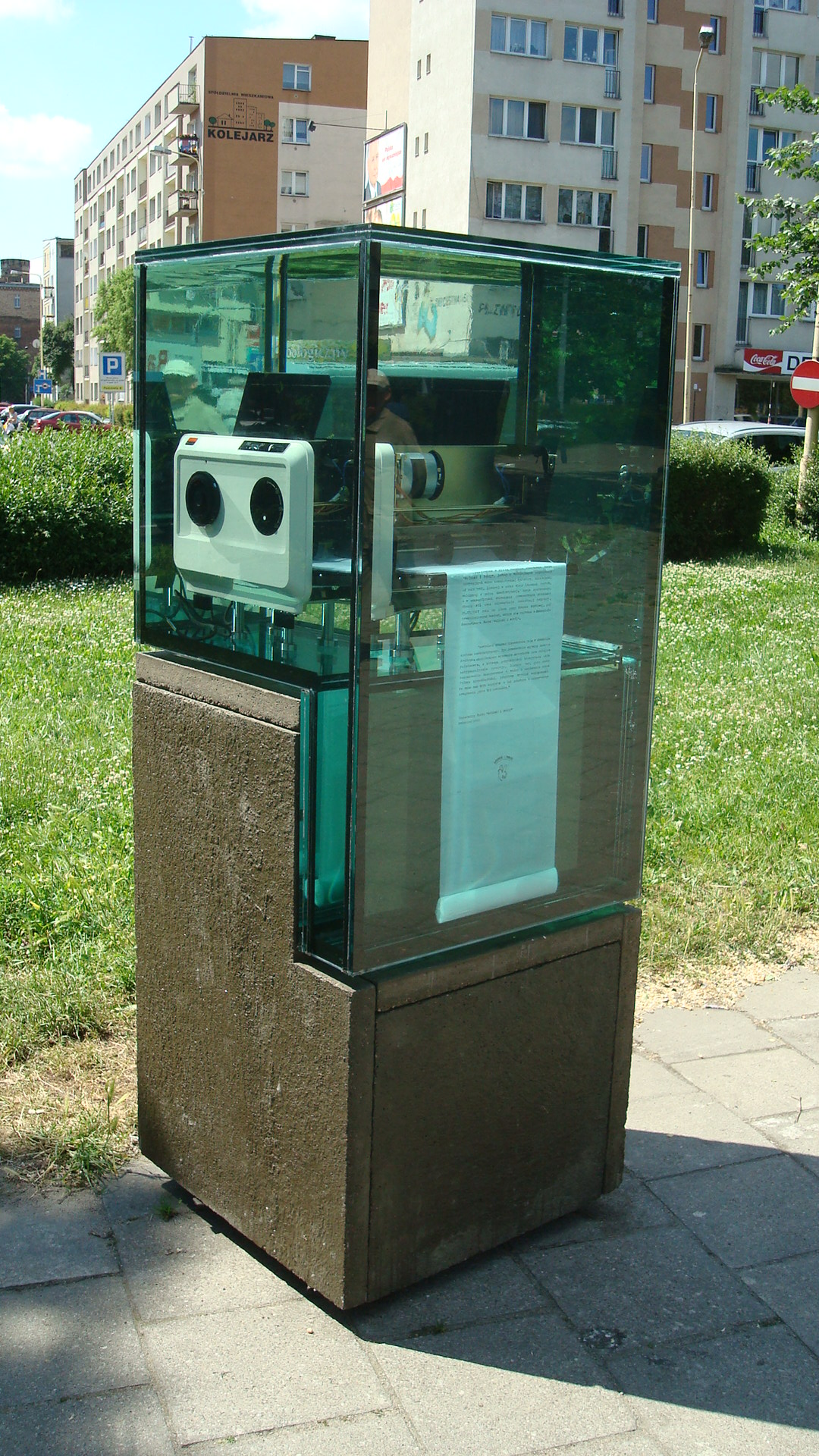
The Duplicating Machine Memorial in Szczecin, Poland, taking the form of a spirit duplicator encased in a desiccated glycerol resin on a concrete pedestal

A spirit duplicator forms a main element of the Duplicating Machine Memorial, being encased in a desiccated glycerol resin, behind a glass casing, and placed on a granite pedestal. The sculpture is placed at the Victory Square in Szczecin, Poland, and commemorates the Freedom and Peace Movement, a dissident organization operating in opposition to the government of the Polish People's Republic from 1985 to 1992. The machine was chosen, as it was commonly used by the organisation to print its publications. It was designed by Dorota Tołłoczko-Femerling, and unveiled on 12 June 2010.

== See also ==
- Hectograph
- List of duplicating processes
