= Kornel Ujejski =

Polish poet (1823–1897)

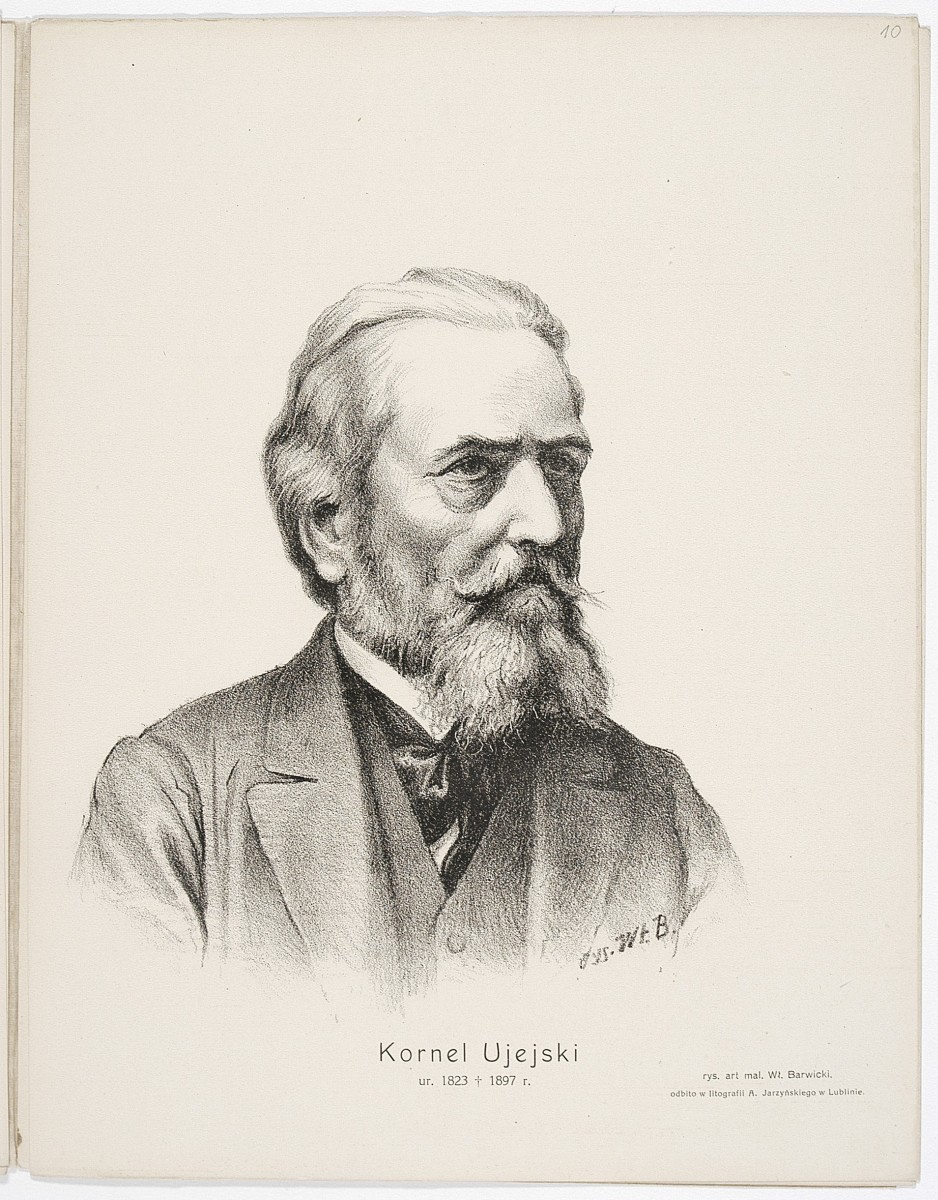
Kornel Ujejski

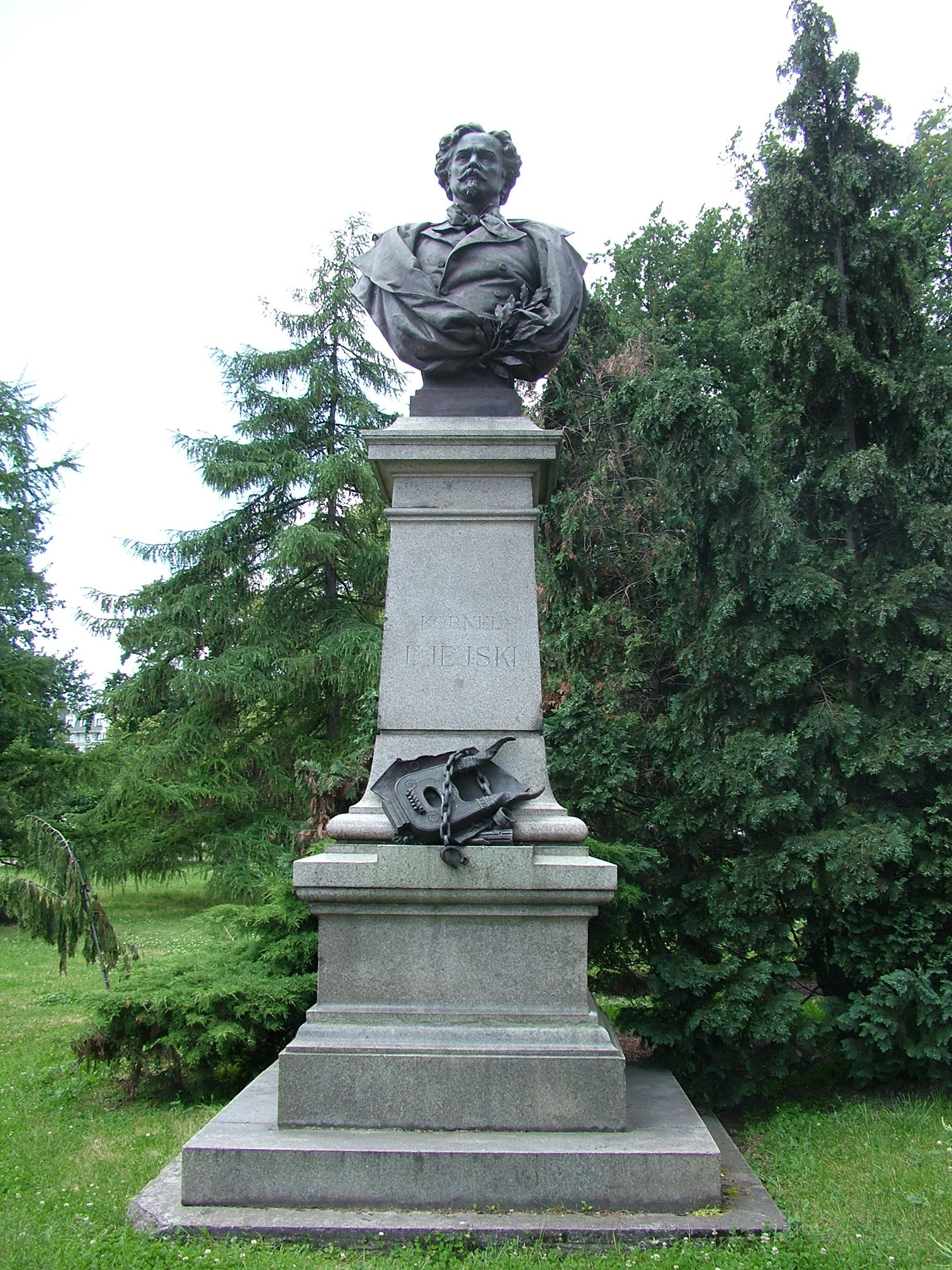
Kornel Ujejski - monument in Szczecin, Poland moved form Lviv in 1946

Kornel Ujejski (Polish pronunciation: [ˈkɔr.nɛl u.ˈjɛj.skʲi]; September 12, 1823 in Beremyany, Galicia, Austria - September 19, 1897 in Pavliv near Lviv, Galicia, Austria), also known as Cornelius Ujejski, was a Polish poet, patriot and political writer of the Austrian Empire and Austria-Hungary.

He was named "last of the greatest Polish poets of Romanticism".

Kornel was born in a village on Dniester between Buchach and Tlumach. Ujejski was involved in Poland's struggle for independence after it had been partitioned and erased from the map of Europe by neighbouring countries (Russian Empire, Prussia and Austrian Empire). In 1846, at the instigation of the Austrian Government during the Kraków Uprising, the Galician peasants massacred several thousand of the nobility. Ujejski then gave utterance to the universal feeling of indignation in his powerful poem Choral, which has become one of the notable patriotic Polish songs of that period.

The political situation in partitioned Poland was reflected in his poems and political writing. His writing conveyed patriotic and historic message and was meant to support the Polish people in their fight for independence.

== Works ==
- Maraton (Marathon, 1845)
- Pieśni Salomona (The Songs of Solomon, 1846)
- Skargi Jeremiego (The Complaints of Jeremy, 1847)
- Do Moskali (To the Muscovites, 1862)
- Tłumaczenia Szopena (Translations of Chopin, 1866)

== See also ==
- Polish literature
- List of Polish language poets
- History of Poland
