= Harbour Gate =

Historical city gate in Szczecin, Poland

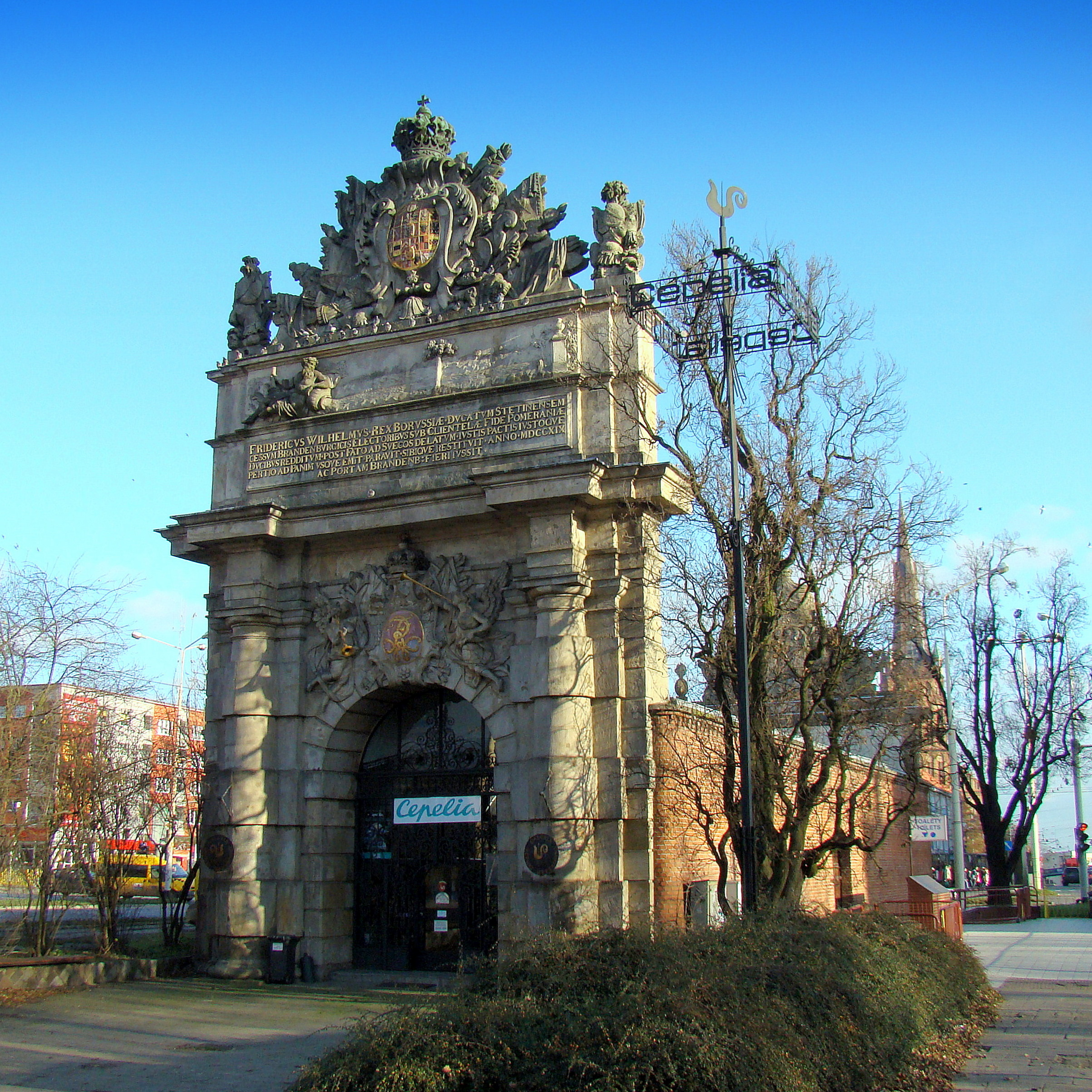
- The building in 2009.
- Interactive map of the Harbour Gate area

General information
- Type: City gate
- Architectural style: Baroque
- Location: Szczecin, Poland, 2 Harbour Gate Square
- Coordinates: 53°25′30″N 14°33′00″E
- Construction started: 1725
- Completed: 1727

Technical details
- Floor count: 1

Design and construction
- Architect: Gerhard Cornelius van Wallrawe
- Other designers: Bartholomé Damart; Hans Jürgen Reinecke

The Harbour Gate (Polish: Brama Portowa; German: Hafentor), formerly known as the Berlin Gate (Polish: Brama Berlińska; German: Berliner Tor), and the Brandenburg Gate (Polish: Brama Brandenburska; German: Brandenburger Tor), is a historic Baroque city gate in Szczecin, Poland, located at the intersection of Independence Avenue, Wyszyńskiego Street, and Victory Square. It was constructed between 1725 and 1727, with the project being designed by Gerhard Cornelius van Wallrawe, and its elaborate façade sculptures done by Bartholomé Damart. It served as one of the entrances to the city, and was part of the fortification walls, until 1841, when they were deconstructed. Currently, it serves as a community theatre venue.

== History ==
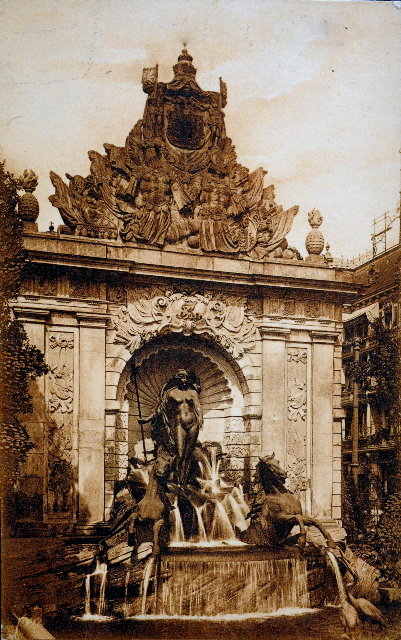
The Amphitrite Fountain, sometime between 1902 and 1920.

The construction of the city gate was ordered by king Frederick William I of Prussia in 1724, and lasted from 1725 to 1727. Attached to the fortification walls, it was one of the entrances to the city, and was protected by the nearby Royal and Passau bastions. The building was designed by military architect Gerhard Cornelius van Wallrawe, with the masonry done by Hans Jürgen Reinecke, and the façade sculptures by Bartholomé Damart. The bricks used in its construction were manufactured in Liège, Belgium, while its façade and ornamentations were made from sandstone imported from Pirna in Saxony. It was originally named the Brandenburg Gate, and was renamed to the Berlin Gate in 1732, as the road lead from it to the city of Berlin. The name was previously used to refer to a different gate, located at Wyszyńskiego Street, until it was deconstructed the same year. The fortification walls were removed in 1873, with the gate being preserved, and given under the city administration.

In 1902, the Amphitrite Fountain sculptured by Reinhold Felderhoff, was placed in front of the eastern side of the gate, which was by this point bricked up. The sculpture depicted Amphitrite, goddess of the sea in the Greek mythology, as a nude female figure, standing on a chariot drawn by two galloping horses. It was placed on top of a large shallow fountain basin. The nudity of the sculpture caused controversy and protests among some religious conservative women. The location of the fountain and its basin was deemed to interfere with the road traffic, and it was removed on 12 October 1932.

In 1942, during the Second World War, to protect the elaborate sculptures on the top of the gate, from the Allied bombing raids, they were taken down, and hidden in the Arkona Woods. They were reinstalled in 1957. The building itself was covered in ivy to hide it.

The building received the status of a protected cultural property in 1954.

From 1976 to 2013, the building housed an art supplies store. Since 2015, it is a theatre venue of the Szczecin Association of the Friends of Art.

== Characteristics ==
The building is placed next to the intersection of Independence Avenue and Wyszyńskiego Street, and is a central object of the Harbour Gate Square (Polish: Plac Brama Portowa), which is the easternmost tip of the larger Victory Square.

It is a historic city gate, built from bricks, and with Baroque sandstone façade and elaborate ornamentation. It has a form of two gates, connected by a long hallway.

The façade of the western entrance includes a cartouche above the gate archways, featuring a monogram of king Frederick William I of Prussia, with a royal crown put on top of it, two angels to its sides, playin on trumpets, while everything is placed at the backdrop of an elaborate panoply. To the sides, are two pillars. The attic above the cornice of the entablature features a Latin inscription made of letters painted in gold, informing about rightful ownership of the city of Szczecin by the Margraviate of Brandenburg, after it was bought in 1719, by king Frederick William I from the Swedish Empire. Above it, is displayed a relief, depicting the panorama of the city with Viadrus, a god of the Oder river in the local Slavic folklore, placed on the side. At the top, is installed a large sculpture, depicting the great coat of arms of Brandenburg, with a royal crown on top of it, and with a large panoply behind it, consisting of weaponry, armour, shields, and standards.

The inscription reads:

Fridericvs Wilhelmvs·Rex Borrvssiæ·Dvcatum Stetinensem
cessvm Brandenbvrgicis Electoribvs svb Clientelæ Fide Pomeraniæ
Dvcibvs redditvm·Post Fato ad Svecos delatvm·Ivstis pactis ivstoqve
pertio ad Panim vsqve emit·paravit·sibiqve restitvit·Anno·MDCCXIX
ac Portam Brandenb:fieri ivssit·

It translates to:

Frederick William, King of Prussia, bought the Duchy of Stettin, which had been transferred to the Electors of Brandenburg and returned to the Dukes of Pomerania under their feudal sovereignty, which later, through fate, had come to Sweden. In fair contracts and for a fair price, he acquired it up to the Peene and incorporated it back into his state. In 1719, he had this Brandenburg Gate built.

The façade of the eastern entrance also includes a cartouche with a monogram of king Frederick William I of Prussia, and a panoply. To its sides are reliefs of four pillars decorated with panoply. At the top is placed a large sculpture with the great coat of arms of Brandenburg, held by the wild men, a royal crown on top of it, and the Order of the Black Eagle hang from it. Below it are two sets of Roman armour. In the background is a large panoply.

Currently, the building serves as a theatre venue for the Szczecin Association of the Friends of Art. It has the status of a protected cultural property.

== Gallery ==
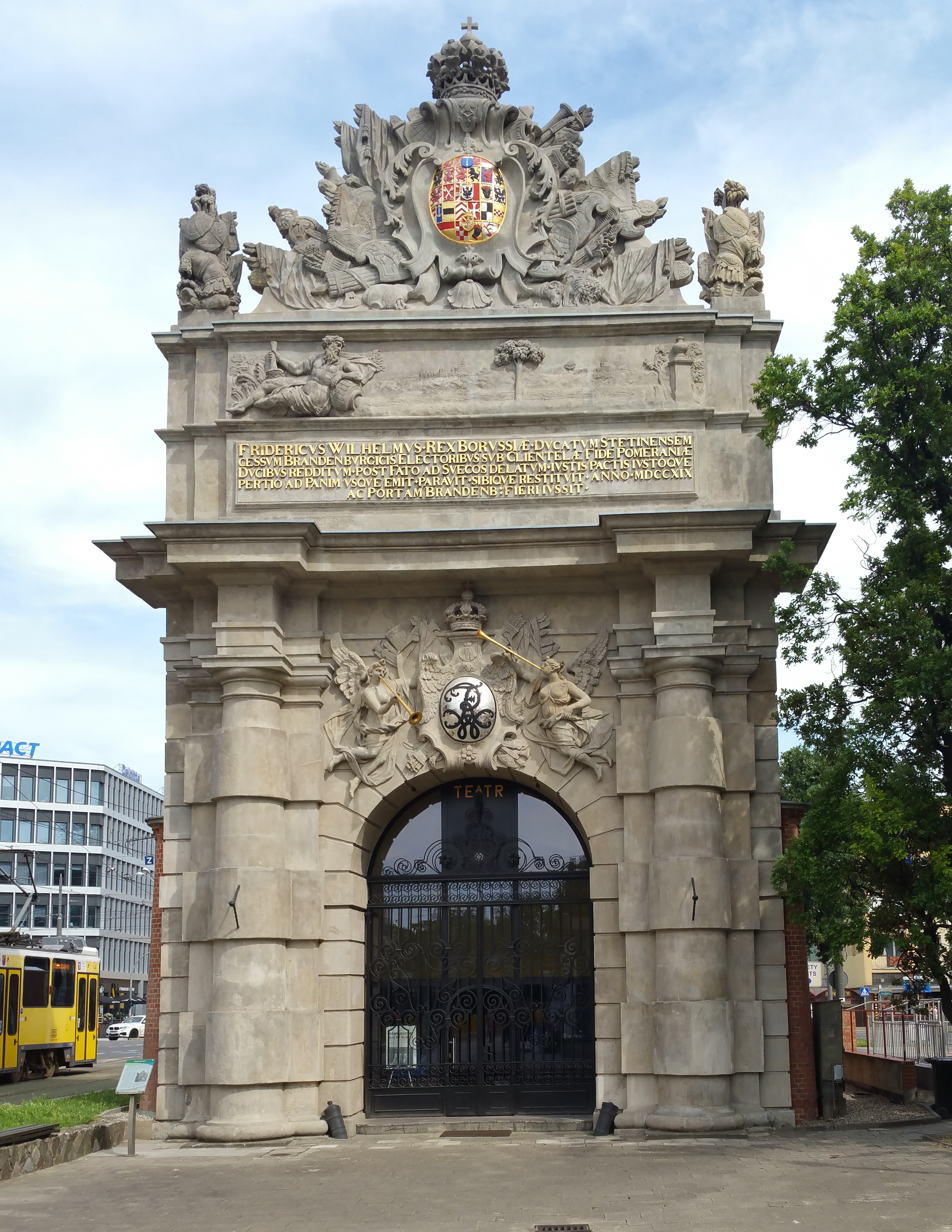
The west façade.

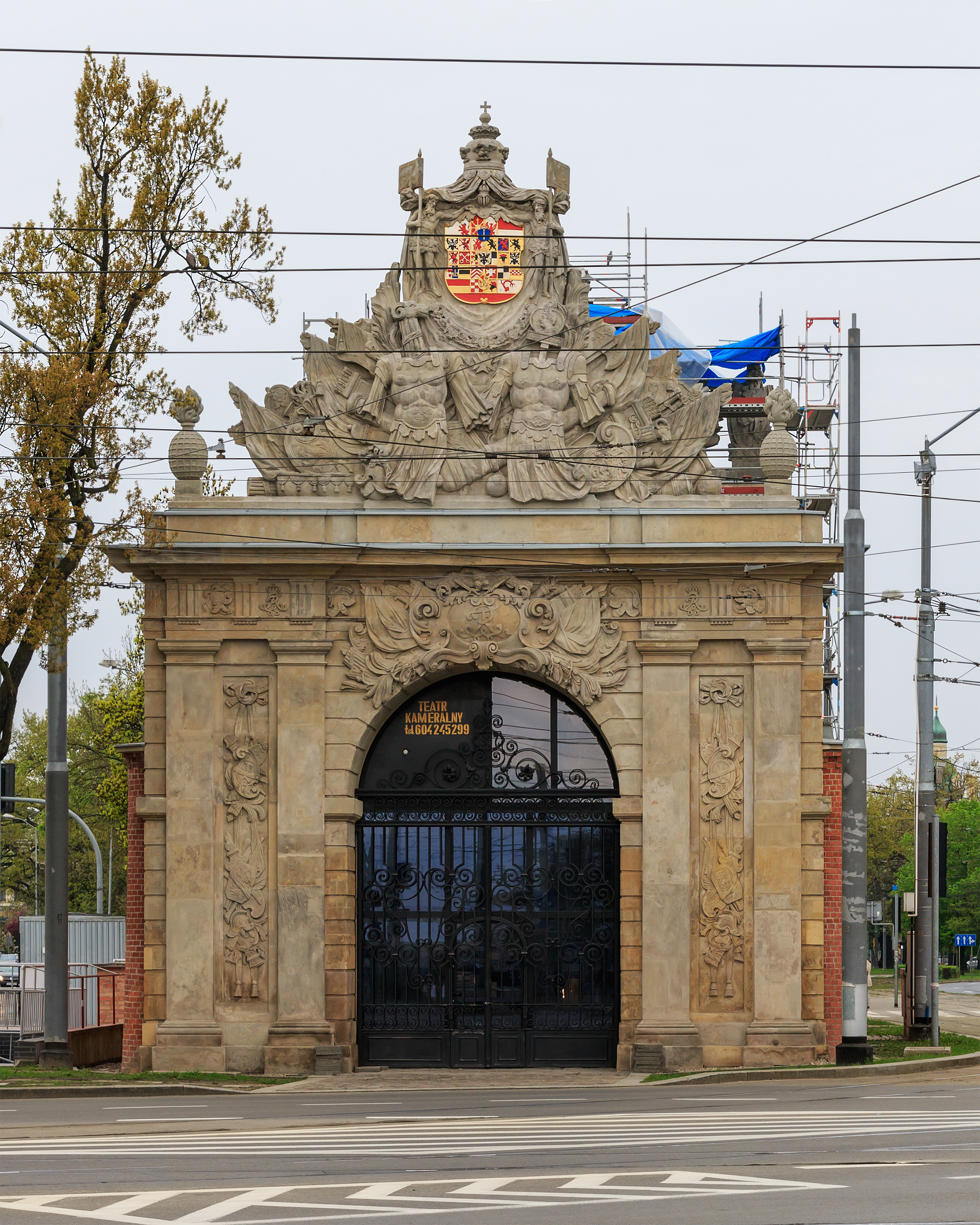
The east façade.

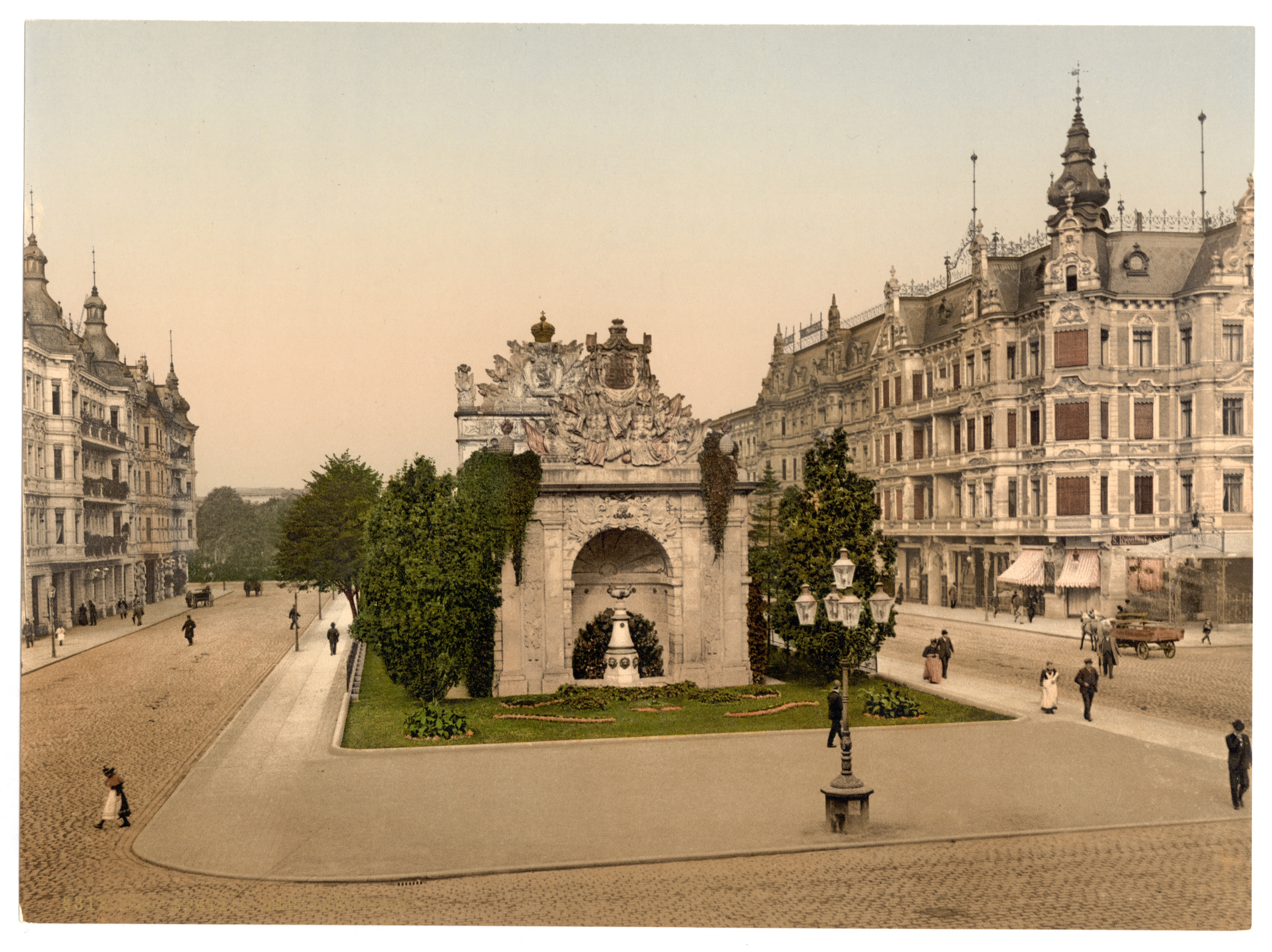
The Harbour Gate sometime between 1890 and 1990.
