= 1898 in art =

The year 1898 in art involved some significant events.

== Events ==
- Berlin Secession.
- Bromsgrove Guild of Applied Arts, a company of artists and designers associated with the Arts and Crafts Movement, is founded by sculptor Walter Gilbert in Britain.
- Käthe Kollwitz's cycle of lithographs and etchings The Weavers is first exhibited publicly.
- The term "Young Poland" is coined after a manifesto by Artur Górski, published in the Kraków newspaper Życie ("Life"), to signify the period of modernism in the Polish arts.
- Henri Matisse marries Amélie Noellie Parayre and, on the advice of Camille Pissarro, goes to London to study the paintings of J. M. W. Turner, continuing to Corsica.
- The Hope Collection of Pictures is sold in London for the sum of £121,550.

== Works ==
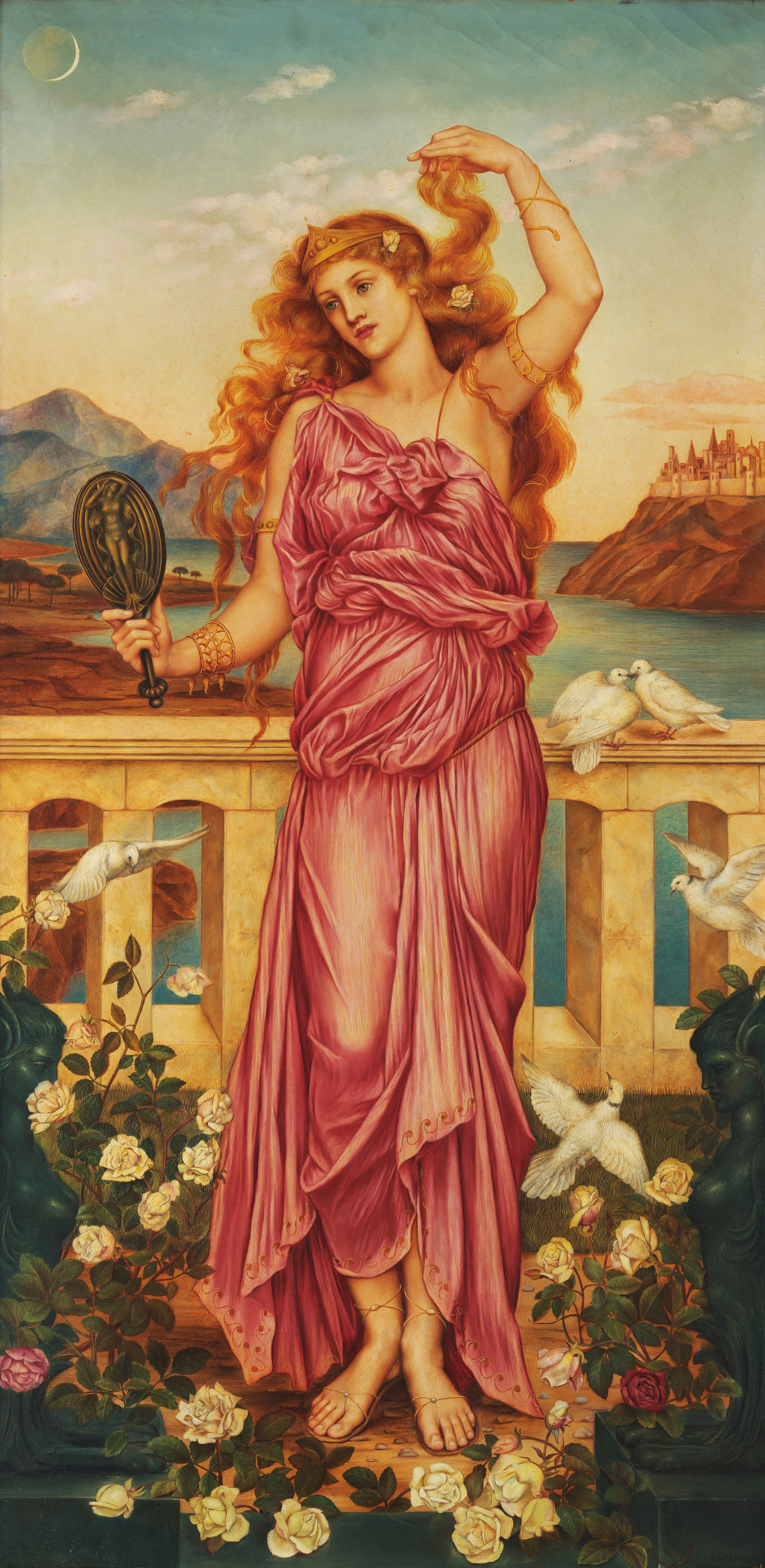
Evelyn De Morgan – Helen of Troy

=== Paintings ===
- Edwin Austin Abbey – King Lear, Act I, Scene I
- Almeida Júnior – The Inopportune
- Ivan Aivazovsky – Among Waves
- Teodor Axentowicz – Self-portrait
- Arnold Böcklin – Plague
- Edward Burne-Jones – The Last Sleep of Arthur in Avalon (completed)
- John Collier – Godiva
- Luigi Crosio – Refugium Peccatorum Madonna
- Evelyn De Morgan – Helen of Troy
- Herbert James Draper – The Lament for Icarus
- Thomas Eakins – Salutat
- Paul Gauguin – The White Horse (Musée d'Orsay, Paris)
- J. W. Godward
  - At The Gate Of The Temple
  - Idle thoughts
  - On The Balcony (first version)
  - The Ring
- Vilhelm Hammershøi – Interior with young man reading
- Edward Robert Hughes – The Shrew Katherina
- Gustav Klimt
  - Music II
  - Fish Blood
  - Flowing water
  - Pallas Athene
  - Portrait of Sonja Knips
  - Portrait of Helene Klimt
- Anna Elizabeth Klumpke – Rosa Bonheur
- Henri Matisse – Le Mur Rose
- Edvard Munch – Metabolism
- Alfred Munnings – Stranded
- Armand Point – Dance of Salome
- Pierre-Auguste Renoir – Yvonne and Christine Lerolle at the Piano
- L. A. Ring – Ved frokostbordet og morgenaviserne ("At Breakfast")
- Therese Schwartze – Portrait of Wilhelmina of the Netherlands in her coronation robes
- Henry Ossawa Tanner – The Annunciation
- James Tissot – Self-portrait
- F. C. Yohn – Winter at Valley Forge - The Relief

=== Sculptures ===
- Arthur Beter – Dutchy
- Camille Claudel – L'Implorante (The Implorer)
- John S. Conway – The Victorious Charge
- Reinhold Felderhoff – Diana
- Daniel Chester French – Statue of Rufus Choate

=== Other ===
- F. Holland Day
  - The Seven Last Words of Christ, a series of photographs
  - Study for the Crucifixion, a photograph
- Félix Vallotton – Intimités ("Intimacies"), a suite of woodcuts
- Mary Seton Watts – Watts Cemetery Chapel (Compton, Surrey, England), gesso interior decoration

== Births ==
=== January to June ===
- 26 January – Katarzyna Kobro, Polish sculptor (died 1951)
- 28 January – Milan Konjović, Serbian painter (died 1993)
- 3 February – Alvar Aalto, Finnish architect and designer (died 1976)
- 8 February – Jean Charlot, French painter and illustrator (died 1979)
- 14 March – Reginald Marsh, French-born American painter (died 1954)
- 6 April – Jeanne Hébuterne, French painter and model (suicide 1920)
- 16 May – Jean Fautrier, French painter, practitioner of tachisme (died 1964)
- Tamara de Lempicka, born Maria Górska, Polish-born Art Deco painter (died 1980)
- 17 May – A. J. Casson, Canadian painter (died 1992)
- 21 May
  - Armand Hammer, American art collector (died 1990)
  - John McLaughlin, American hard-edge painter (died 1976)
- 16 June – Tamara de Lempicka, born Maria Górska, Polish-born Art Deco painter (died 1980)
- 17 June
  - M. C. Escher, Dutch graphic artist (died 1972)
  - Fritz Skade, German painter (died 1971)

=== July to December ===
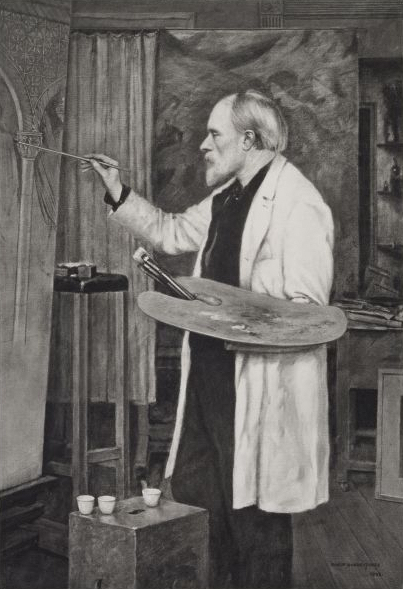
Photogravure of a portrait of Edward Burne-Jones by his son Philip Burne-Jones, 1898

- 2 July – Gen Paul, French painter (died 1975)
- 17 July – Berenice Abbott, American photographer (died 1991)
- 22 July – Alexander Calder, American sculptor and artist (died 1976)
- 30 July – Henry Moore, English artist and sculptor (died 1986)
- 31 July – Doris Zinkeisen, Scottish-born theatrical designer and commercial artist (died 1991)
- 26 August – Peggy Guggenheim, American art collector (died 1979)
- 12 September – Arkady Shaikhet, Ukrainian-born Soviet documentary photographer (died 1959)
- 16 September – Leslie Garland Bolling, African American sculptor (died 1955)
- 25 September – Robert Brackman, Ukrainian-born American artist and teacher (died 1980)
- 10 October
  - Lilly Daché, French milliner and fashion designer (died 1989)
  - Georges Malkine, French painter, only painter to sign the Surrealist Manifesto of 1924 (died 1970)
- 21 November – René Magritte, Belgian surrealist painter (died 1967)
- 6 December – Alfred Eisenstaedt, Prussian-born American photographer (died 1995)
- 10 December – Ivan Tabaković, Serbian painter (died 1977)
- date unknown – E. Chambré Hardman, British photographer (died 1988)

== Deaths ==
- 8 January – Achille Empéraire, French painter and friend of Paul Cézanne (born 1829)
- 25 February – Francis Frith, English topographical photographer (born 1822)
- 16 March – Aubrey Beardsley, English illustrator, of tuberculosis (born 1872)
- 24 March – J. L. K. van Dort, Ceylonese illustrator (born 1831)
- 18 April – Gustave Moreau, French Symbolist painter (born 1826)
- 17 June – Sir Edward Burne-Jones, English Pre-Raphaelite artist (born 1833)
- 29 July – Arturo Michelena, Venezuelan painter (born 1863)
- 8 August – Eugène Boudin, French landscape painter (born 1824)
- 24 October – Pierre Puvis de Chavannes, French painter (born 1824)
- date unknown - Giulio Salviati, Italian glassmaker and mosaicist (born 1843)
