= Choate, Hall & Stewart =

American law firm

Choate, Hall & Stewart LLP
- Headquarters: Boston
- No. of offices: 2
- No. of attorneys: 194
- No. of employees: 460
- Major practice areas: Finance & Restructuring, Intellectual Property, Litigation & Investigations, Private Equity, Wealth Management
- Revenue: $393.1 million (2026)
- Profit per equity partner: $4.32 million (2026)
- Date founded: 1899
- Founder: Charles F. Choate Jr., John Hall, Ralph A. Stewart
- Company type: LLP
- Website: www.choate.com

Choate Hall & Stewart LLP, commonly referred to as "Choate", is a Boston-based law firm. The firm was considered unique in retaining a one-office approach for over 120 years from its founding. As of 2026, the firm was expanding in New York.

== History ==
Choate, Hall & Stewart was founded in 1899 by Charles F. Choate Jr. and John L. Hall, later joined by Ralph A. Stewart. Choate was the nephew of U.S. Ambassador Joseph Hodges Choate and William Gardner Choate, the founder of the Connecticut school Choate Rosemary Hall, and the grand-nephew of lawyer Rufus Choate, whose statue appears in the Suffolk County Courthouse in downtown Boston. Poet and future Librarian of Congress Archibald MacLeish practiced at the firm for three years in the early 1920s. The firm, and Charles F. Choate Jr., represented the United States Industrial Alcohol Company in its defense against litigation stemming from the Boston Molasses Disaster of 1919. Mr. Choate presented the company's case that the disaster had been caused by sabotage by anarchists.

The firm long held the reputation as one of the most genteel of the "Boston Brahmin" white shoe firms. In 2005, the firm hired a number of attorneys fleeing the collapse of Testa, Hurwitz & Thibeault, a firm with many Jewish and Catholic members that focused on business and venture capital, giving Choate an immediate presence in the life sciences and technology fields.

In 2018, Choate, Hall & Stewart joined other national law firms in raising salaries for first-year associates. In 2019, The Vault named Choate one of the top ten law firms to work for in the United States. That same year, the Firm's summer associate program was ranked number seven in the country. In 2025, Choate was ranked as the number 1 summer associate program by The American Lawyer.

In 2019, Choate, Hall & Stewart represented Dennis Publishing in their acquisition of Kiplinger Washington Editors Inc. During the same year, the firm acted as legal counsel for Phoenix Tower International during its purchase of telecommunication assets in the Dominican Republic.

Choate, Hall & Stewart has long engaged in the practice, common only among Boston law firms, of serving as an investment broker, particularly in the 21st century. The firm’s money management affiliate goes by the name of Choate Investment Advisors. In 2023, several wealth management partners joined Choate Investment Advisors from Boston-based law firm Ropes and Gray, bringing trusts controlling more than $2 billion to Choate. Six months later, it acquired the 8 person investment firm Lowell Blake & Associates.
