= Social Law Library =

Coordinates: 42.358989°N 71.061147°W

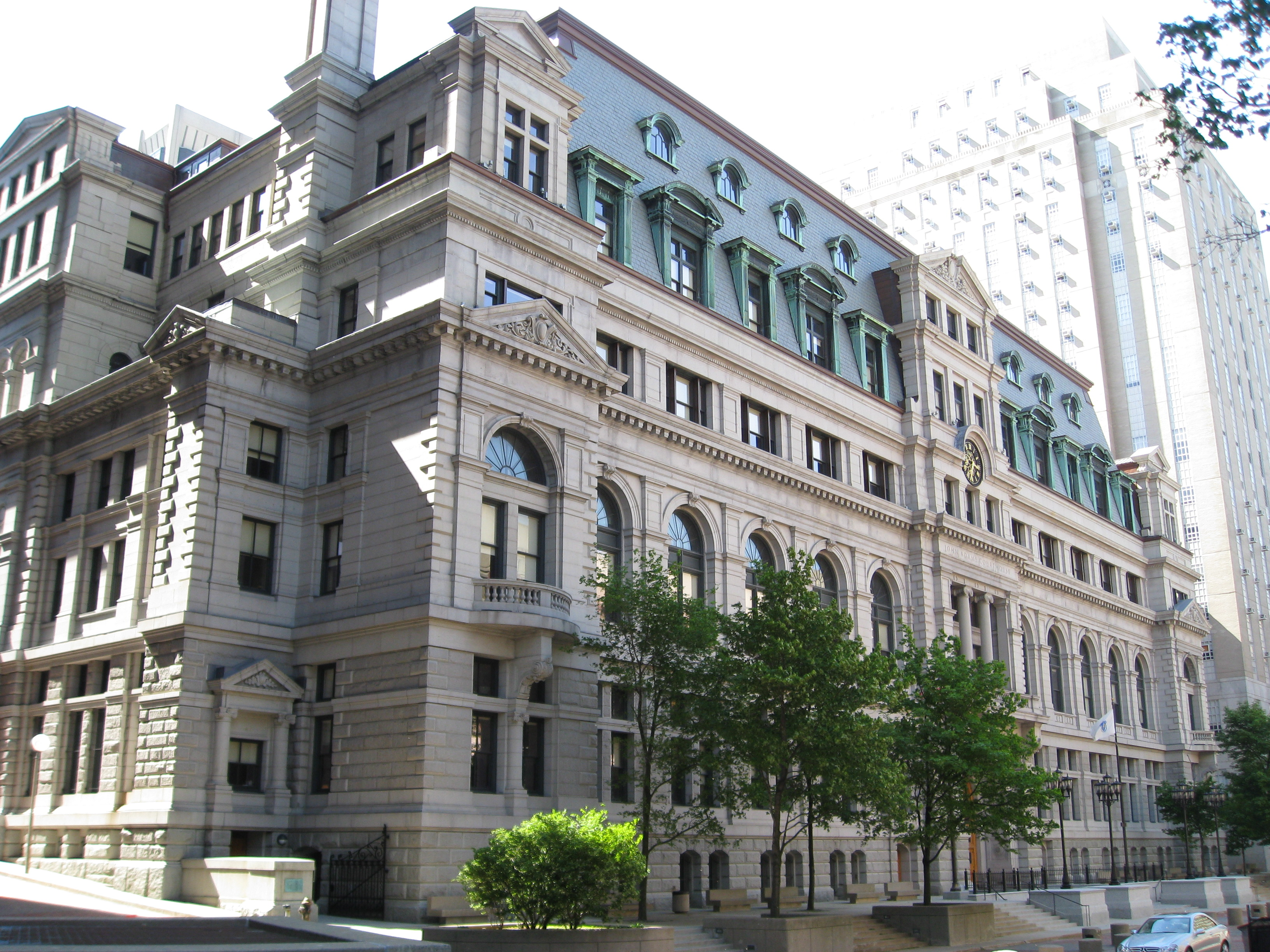
The John Adams Courthouse houses the Social Law Library

The Social Law Library, founded in 1803, is the second-oldest law library in the United States. It is located in the John Adams Courthouse at Pemberton Square in Boston, Massachusetts, the same building which houses the Massachusetts Supreme Judicial Court and the Massachusetts Appeals Court.

== History ==
The history of the library is very much bound up in the history of the Supreme Judicial Court itself. Many of the proprietors of the library were chief justices of the Supreme Judicial Court, including Theophilus Parsons, Lemuel Shaw, Horace Gray, and Oliver Wendell Holmes Jr. The library was also caught up in the debates between the Federalists, who wanted to see the common law (based on English law) received into the newly formed United States, and the Jeffersonians, who preferred to have a civil law-based system similar to the Napoleonic Code. The Federalists, who were prominent in Boston and integral to the library's founding, began importing English law books for local lawyers to use. The Supreme Judicial Court, needing a law library for their own use, permitted the library to be moved into the Court's offices in exchange for access to its many volumes. Meanwhile, the Massachusetts General Court (the state legislature of Massachusetts) established the office of Reporter of Decisions, which was the first office of its kind at the state level in the United States, and the first officially reported decision was Gold v. Eddy (1804). This turn of events allowed the public greater access to the decisions of the courts of Massachusetts, and in turn popularized the common law legal system in the United States.

== Today ==
Today, many lawyers in the Boston area use the library for legal research. Members pay a yearly fee for the privilege of being admitted to the library and using its facilities, with the exception of state, court or non-profit legal services organizations members. The library has over 450,000 volumes of materials, most of which can be searched using an online catalog accessible via the library's web site.
