= Rufus Choate =

American politician (1799–1859)

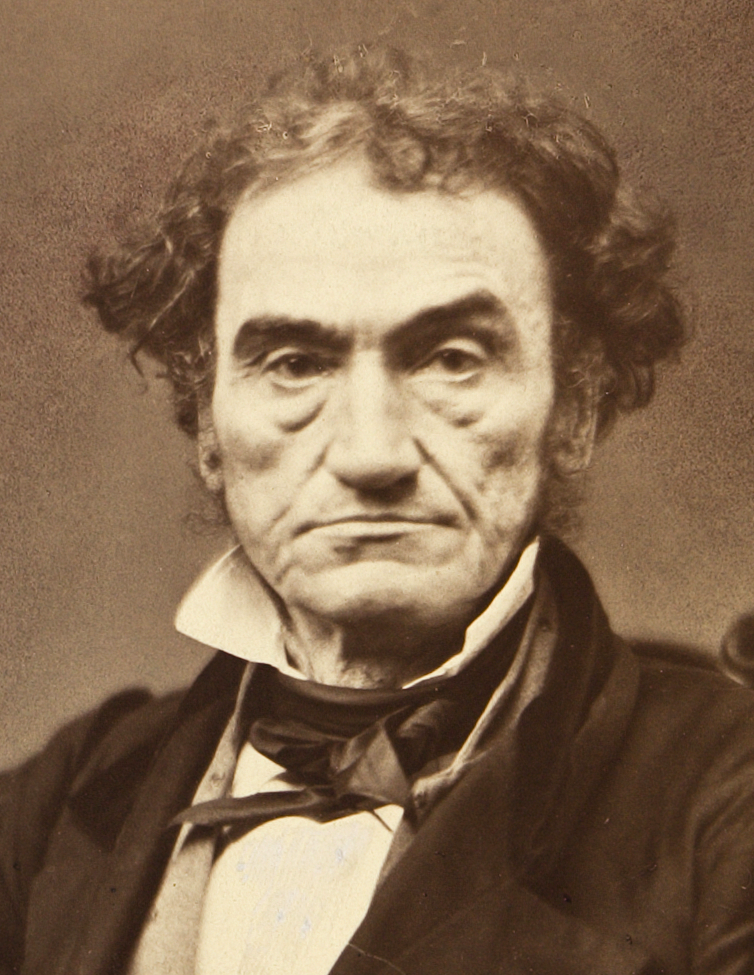
- Choate c. 1853

United States Senator from Massachusetts
- In office February 23, 1841 – March 3, 1845
- Preceded by: Daniel Webster
- Succeeded by: Daniel Webster

Member of the U.S. House of Representatives from Massachusetts's 2nd district
- In office March 4, 1831 – June 30, 1834
- Preceded by: Benjamin W. Crowninshield
- Succeeded by: Stephen C. Phillips

10th Massachusetts Attorney General
- In office 1853–1854
- Governor: John H. Clifford
- Preceded by: John H. Clifford
- Succeeded by: John H. Clifford

Member of the Massachusetts Senate
- In office 1827

Member of the Massachusetts House of Representatives
- In office 1825–1826

Personal details
- Born: October 1, 1799 Ipswich, Massachusetts, U.S.
- Died: July 13, 1859 (aged 59) Halifax, British Canada
- Resting place: Mount Auburn Cemetery; Boston, Massachusetts, U.S.
- Party: Whig
- Education: Dartmouth College; Harvard University
- Profession: Law

Rufus Choate (/tʃoʊt/) (October 1, 1799 – July 13, 1859) was an American lawyer, orator, and senator who represented Massachusetts as a member of the Whig Party. He is regarded as one of the greatest American lawyers of the 19th century, arguing over a thousand cases in a lifetime practice extending to virtually every branch of the law then recognized. Notably, he was one of the pioneers of the legal technique of arousing jury sympathy in tort cases. In one instance, he won a record judgement of $22,500 for a badly injured widow, the most ever awarded to a plaintiff at the time.

Along with his colleague and close associate Daniel Webster, he is also regarded as one of the greatest orators of his age. Among his most famous orations are his Address on The Colonial Age of New England delivered at the centennial celebration of the settlement of Ipswich, Massachusetts in 1831 and his Address on The Age of the Pilgrims as the Heroic Period of Our History before the New England Society of New York in 1843. Through these addresses, Choate became one of the most prominent advocates of promoting the Puritan settlers as the first founders of the American republic.

A staunch nationalist and unionist, Choate was among several former Whigs to oppose the Republican Party over concerns that it was a "sectional party" whose platform threatened to separate the Union. In turn, he publicly voiced his support for Democratic candidate James Buchanan over Republican John C. Frémont in the 1856 presidential election.

== Early life ==
Rufus Choate was born in Ipswich, Massachusetts, the son of Miriam (Foster) and David Choate, a teacher and Revolutionary War veteran. He was a descendant of an English family which settled in Massachusetts in 1643. His first cousin, physician George Choate, was the father of George C. S. Choate and Joseph Hodges Choate. Rufus Choate's birthplace, Choate House, remains virtually unchanged to this day.

A precocious child, at six he is said to have been able to repeat large parts of the Bible and of Pilgrim's Progress from memory. He was elected to Phi Beta Kappa and graduated as valedictorian of his class at Dartmouth College in 1819, was a tutor there in 1819–1820.

In the fall of 1820 he was entered at the Dane Law School in Cambridge, under the instruction of Chief Justice Parker and Professor Asahel Stearns. In the following year Choate studied in Washington, D.C. in the office of William Wirt, then Attorney General of the United States.

== Career ==
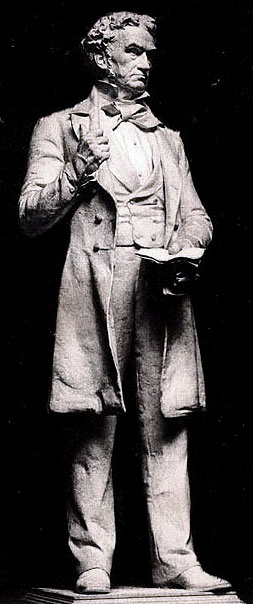
Statue of Rufus Choate by noted American sculptor Daniel Chester French at the John Adams Courthouse in Boston, Massachusetts

He was admitted to the Massachusetts bar in 1823 and practiced at what was later South Danvers (now Peabody) for five years, during which time he served in the Massachusetts House of Representatives (1825–1826) and in the Massachusetts Senate (1827).

In 1828, he moved to Salem, where his successful conduct of several important lawsuits brought him prominently into public notice. In 1830 he was elected to Congress as a Whig from Salem, defeating the Jacksonian candidate for re-election, Benjamin Crowninshield, a former United States Secretary of the Navy, and in 1832 he was re-elected. His career in Congress was marked by a speech in defence of a protective tariff.

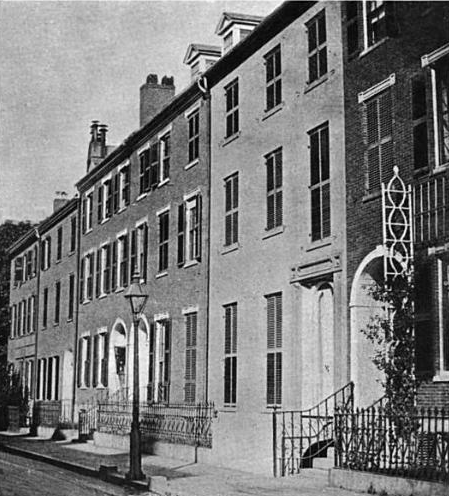
Choate lived on Winthrop Place, Boston, 1851-1859

In 1834, before the completion of his second term, he resigned and established himself in the practice of law in Boston. Already his reputation as a speaker had spread beyond New England, and he was much sought after as an orator for public occasions. His skill was so great that when he argued cases at the Norfolk County Courthouse, students from the nearby Dedham High School would be dismissed to listen to his orations. For several years, he devoted himself unremittingly to his profession but, in 1841, succeeded fellow Dartmouth graduate Daniel Webster in the United States Senate. Shortly afterwards he delivered an address at the memorial services for President William Henry Harrison at Faneuil Hall.

In the Senate, he spoke on the tariff, the Oregon boundary, in favor of the Fiscal Bank Act, and in opposition to the annexation of Texas. On Webster's re-election to the Senate in 1845, Choate resumed his law practice. He later served a short term as attorney-general of Massachusetts in 1853–1854. In 1846, Choate convinced a jury that the accused, Albert Tirrell, did not cut the throat of his lover, or, if he did so, he did it while sleepwalking, under the 'insanity of sleep'. His successful use of sleepwalking as a defense against murder charges was the first time in American legal history this defense was successful in a murder prosecution. He was a faithful supporter of Webster's policy as declared in the latter's Seventh of March Speech of 1850 and labored to secure for him the presidential nomination at the 1852 Whig National Convention, at which Choate himself received one vote on the 40th ballot. In 1853, he was a member of the state constitutional convention.

In 1856, he refused to follow most of his former Whig associates into the Republican Party and gave his support to Democrat James Buchanan, whom he considered the representative of a national instead of a sectional party.

== Speeches ==
The Colonial Age of New England, 1831.

The Importance of Illustrating New-England History by a Series of Romances like the Waverly Novels, 1833.

The Age of the Pilgrims as the Heroic Period of Our History, 1843.

The Positions and Functions of the American Bar, as an Element of Conservatism in the State, 1845.

American Nationality, 1856,

The Eloquence of Revolutionary Periods, 1857.

== Health ==
In 1850 Choate traveled Europe for three months to improve his health. He was accompanied by his old friend and well-known lawyer, the Hon. Joseph M. Bell, who married Choate's sister, and later his daughter Helen.

In 1859, failing health led him to seek rest yet again in Europe. In June 1859, he sailed from Boston to England, became worse and left the ship at Halifax, Nova Scotia, where he died on July 13. He was buried at Mount Auburn Cemetery in Boston.

== Family ==
With his wife Helen Olcott, whom he married on March 29, 1825, Choate had seven children: Catherine Bell (1826–1830), an infant child (1828–1828), Helen Olcott Bell (1830–1918), Sarah (1831–1875), Rufus (1834–1866), Miriam Foster (1835–??), and Caroline (1837–1840).

== Legacy ==
Choate's private library contained seven thousand books with three thousand volumes in his law library. His childhood home is preserved by the Trustees of Reservations on the Crane Wildlife Refuge. A statue of him stands in the Suffolk County Courthouse in Boston.

== Works ==
- Works — edited, with a memoir, by S. G. Brown, and published in two volumes at Boston in 1862
- Memoir — published in 1870
- EG Parker's Reminiscences of Rufus Choate (New York, 1860)
- EP Whipple's Some Recollections of Rufus Choate (New York, 1879)
- Albany Law Review of 1877–1878
- Claude Fuess' Rufus Choate, The Wizard of the Law (1928)
- The Political Writings of Rufus Choate (2003)

U.S. House of Representatives
| Preceded by Benjamin Crowninshield | Member of the U.S. House of Representatives from Massachusetts's 2nd congressional district 1831 – 1834 | Succeeded by Stephen C. Phillips |
U.S. Senate
| Preceded by Daniel Webster | U.S. senator (Class 1) from Massachusetts; 1841 – 1845; Served alongside: Isaac C. Bates | Succeeded by Daniel Webster |
Political offices
| Preceded by John H. Clifford | Attorney General of Massachusetts; 1853 – 1854 | Succeeded by John H. Clifford |
