= Diana (Felderhoff) =

Bronze sculpture of Diana

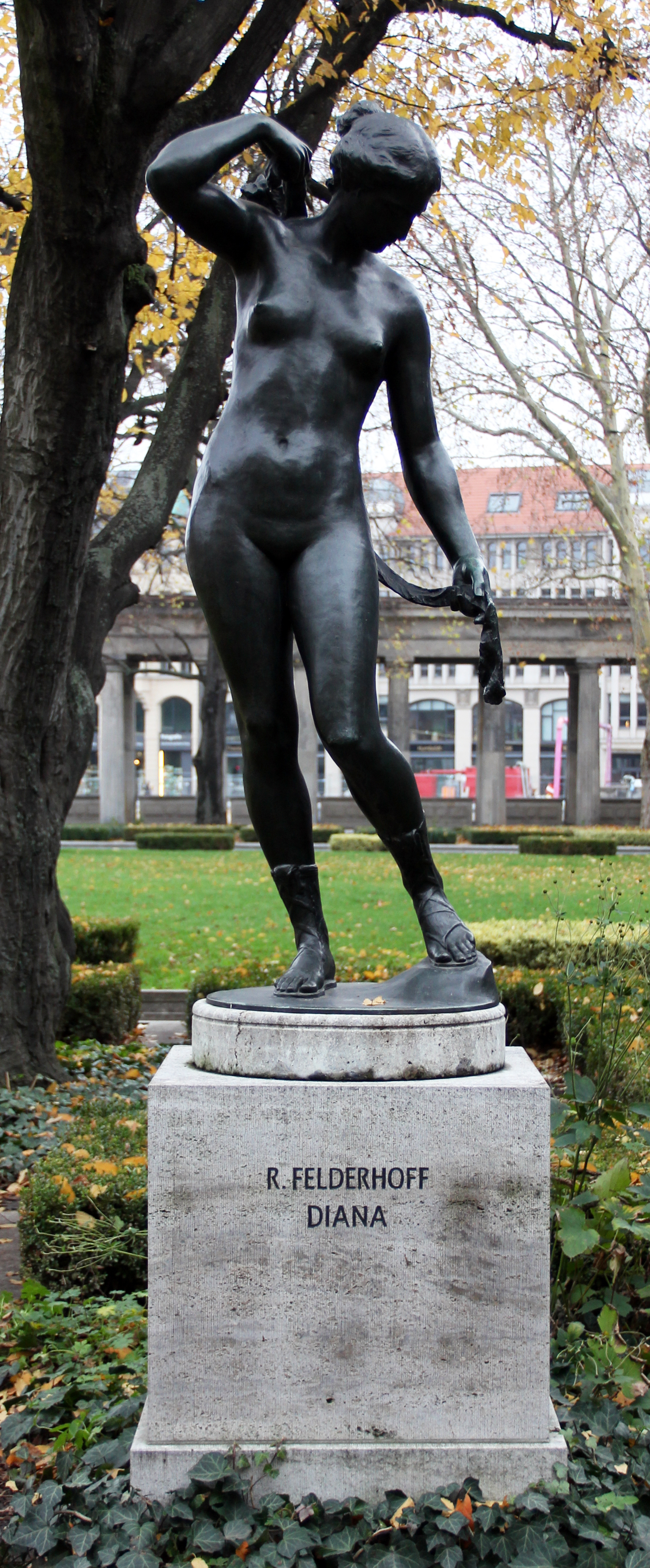
- The sculpture in 2013
- Artist: Reinhold Felderhoff
- Year: 1898
- Subject: Diana

Diana is an outdoor 1898 bronze sculpture of Diana by Reinhold Felderhoff, cast in 1910 and installed in the Kolonnadenhof outside the Alte Nationalgalerie in Berlin, Germany.

== See also ==
- 1898 in art
