= Statue of Rufus Choate =

Statue in Boston, Massachusetts

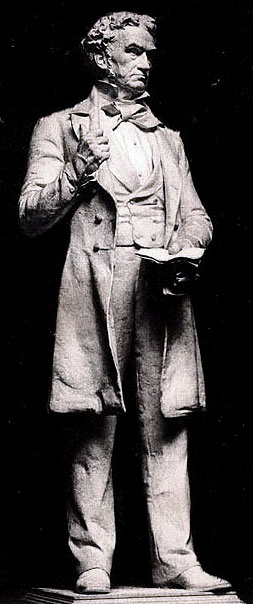
- Statue of Rufus Choate, c. 1898
- Location: John Adams Courthouse, Boston, Massachusetts, United States
- Designer: Daniel Chester French
- Material: Bronze
- Dedicated date: October 15, 1898
- Dedicated to: Rufus Choate

A statue of Rufus Choate stands in the John Adams Courthouse in Boston, Massachusetts, United States. The statue was designed by Daniel Chester French and honors Choate, a lawyer and politician from Massachusetts. It was dedicated in 1898.

== History ==
Rufus Choate was a lawyer and politician from Massachusetts during the early to mid 1800s. He was well known as a lawyer, with The New York Times calling him "[t]he foremost lawyer of New England during the decade preceding the War of the Rebellion". Also active in politics, Choate would go on to serve in both houses of the Massachusetts General Court as well as both houses of U.S. Congress. He died in 1859. When George B. Hyde, a schoolmaster from Boston, died in the late 1800s, he left in his will a bequest of money for the erection of a statue honoring Choate. Sculptor Daniel Chester French was selected to design the monument, which was to be built for the opening of the Suffolk County Courthouse (now known as the John Adams Courthouse or the "Old" Suffolk County Courthouse) in Pemberton Square.

The statue was dedicated on October 15, 1898, with Boston mayor Josiah Quincy giving the Boston Bar Association the responsibility for conducting the unveiling ceremony. The association had formed a committee for this purpose that included Patrick Collins. The ceremony began with an address by Lewis S. Dabney, president of the Boston Bar Association. This was followed by the unveiling of the statue by Benjamin D. Hyde (relative of George Hyde), who presented the statue to the city of Boston. The statue was accepted in an address given by Mayor Quincy, and afterwards, chief justice Walbridge A. Field of the Massachusetts Supreme Judicial Court gave an address where he accepted custodianship of the statue on behalf of the court. The ceremony concluded with a speech given by Joseph H. Choate Jr.

In recent times, before the statue was cleaned, only the left toe of the statue gleamed, as attorneys would rub the toe for good luck.

== Design ==
The statue is made of bronze and depicts a standing Choate holding papers in his left hand and grabbing his lapel with his right. The front of the pedestal bears the following inscription:

RUFUS CHOATE / 1799–1859 / ERECTED BY THE CITY OF BOSTON / WITH MONEY BEQUEATHED / FOR THE PURPOSE BY / GEORGE B. HYDE

== See also ==
- 1898 in art
- Public sculptures by Daniel Chester French

== Bibliography ==
- Addresses Delivered at the Unveiling of the Statue of Rufus Choate in the Court House in Boston, October 15, 1898. Boston Bar Association. Boston: Alfred Mudge & Son. 1899 – via Internet Archive.
- "History of the John Adams Courthouse". Government of Massachusetts. Archived from the original on March 15, 2021.
- "Rufus Choate, (sculpture)". Smithsonian Institution Research Information System. Archived from the original on May 28, 2021.
- "Unveiling of the Statue of Rufus Choate". The American Lawyer. Vol. VI, no. 12. December 1898. pp. 451–453 – via Google Books.
- "THE STATUE OF RUFUS CHOATE". The New York Times. July 11, 1897. ISSN 0362-4331. Archived from the original on May 14, 2021.
