= Edward Griffin Parker =

American politician

Edward Griffin Parker (November 16, 1825 – March 30, 1868) was an American lawyer, editor and writer.

He entered College from Boston, where he was born, and graduated from Yale College in 1847. On graduating he studied law in the office of Rufus Choate. Being admitted to the bar in 1849, he commenced practice in Boston, where he continued until the start of the American Civil War. He was prominent in state politics, and a member of both houses of the Massachusetts Legislature. During his residence in Massachusetts, he published The Golden Age of American Oratory (Boston, 1857), and Reminiscences of Rufus Choate (N. Y., 1860). He was also a contributor to some of the leading literary journals. On the breaking out of the American Civil War, Parker (having acquired thd title of colonel from his position on the staff of Gov. Nathaniel P. Banks) entered the service as captain on Gen. Butler's staff. Later he was adjutant general and chief of staff of Gen. John H. Martindale during the time that the latter commanded the Department of Washington. At the close of the war he settled in New York, and went into business in Wall St. Not being particularly successful, he took charge of the American Literary Bureau of Reference, and was thus engaged at the time of his death, at the Everett House in New York City, March 30, 1868, aged 42 years. He was survived by his wife.

This article incorporates public domain material from the Yale Obituary Record.

== Works ==
- “The Golden Age of American Oratory” (Boston, 1857)
- “Reminiscences of Rufus Choate” (New York, 1860)
