= Dutchy (statue) =

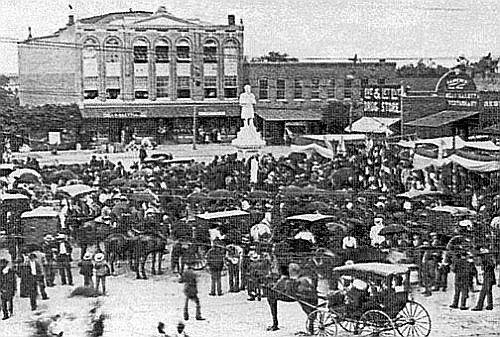
- Unveiling of the statue in 1898
- Artist: Arthur Beter
- Completion date: July 15, 1898
- Medium: Granite
- Subject: Confederate soldier
- Dimensions: 210 cm (7 ft)
- Location: Elberton Granite Museum and Exhibit, Elberton, Georgia

"Dutchy" is the nickname of a Confederate monument in Elberton, Georgia. Unveiled in 1898, the statue was criticized for its poor design, and in 1900 the statue was toppled and buried by townspeople. The statue was later unearthed in 1982 and currently is on display in a local museum.

== History ==
Elberton, Georgia, is a city in north Georgia that is nicknamed the "Granite Capital of the World" due to its granite production. In the late 1890s, residents of the city, wanting to promote both their granite industry and the Lost Cause of the Confederacy, commissioned the creation of a Confederate monument. This was during a time when many other cities and towns in the Southern United States were erecting monuments and memorials to the Confederate States of America.

Sculptor Arthur Beter was commissioned to create the monument. Little is known about Beter, except that he was an immigrant to the United States, possibly from either Germany or Italy. The granite for the statue was donated by Nathanael Long, a local doctor and businessman, at the request of the Women's Confederate Memorial Society.

=== Unveiling ===
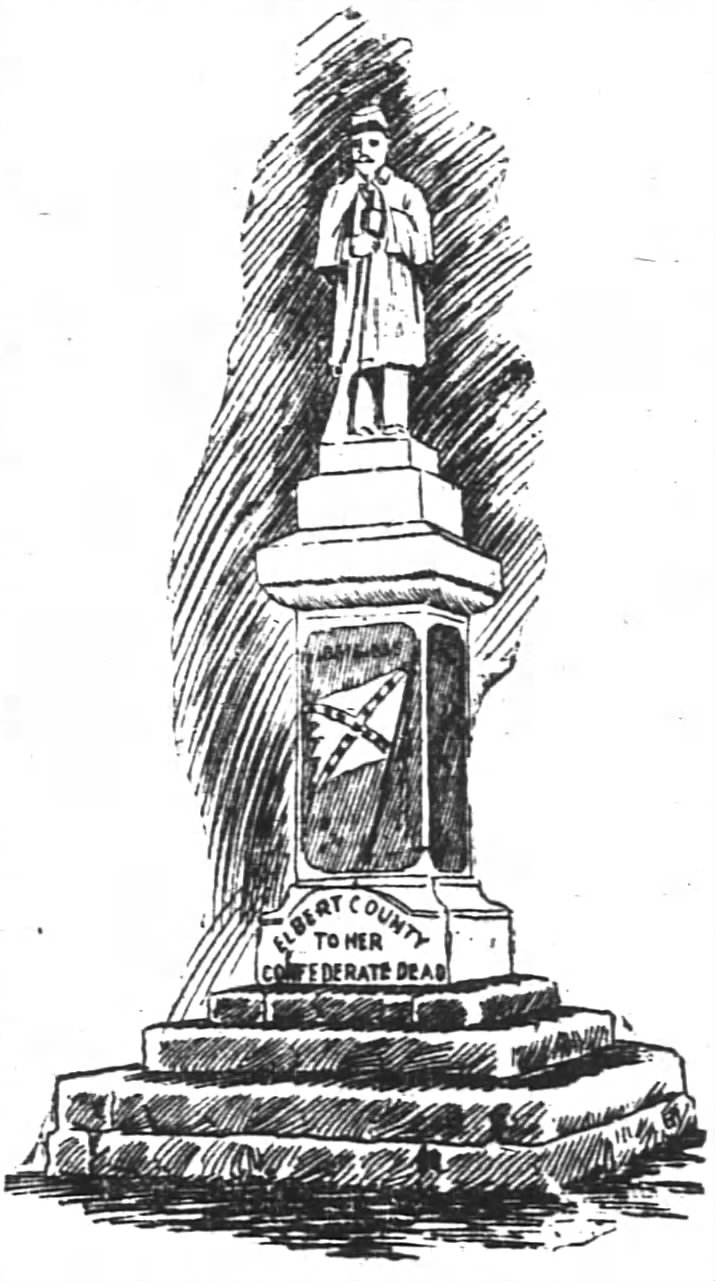
Drawing of the statue, published in The Atlanta Constitution the day after its unveiling

Beter's monument was unveiled on July 15, 1898. It consisted of a 7-foot-tall (2.1 m) statue of a Confederate soldier atop a 22-foot-tall (6.7 m) pedestal. The location of the monument was in Elberton's town square, named Sutton Square. The statue was notable for being the first statue carved from granite from Elberton, which later became a major center for granite monument construction.

From the time of its unveiling, the statue was the subject of criticism due to its appearance. According to legend, Beter had never seen a Confederate soldier, and the statue depicted a soldier wearing a Union Army outfit and a kepi. In a 1945 article in The Atlanta Constitution, the statue was described as having a “foreign helmet and decidedly northern dress.” The statue was also criticized for looking like "a cross between a Pennsylvania Dutchman and a hippopotamus," and shortly thereafter the statue adopted the nickname "Dutchy." Beter left Elberton shortly after the monument's unveiling.

=== Removal ===
The statue was removed on August 14, 1900. That morning, townspeople, including some Confederate veterans who took issue with the figure's resemblance of a Union soldier, toppled the statue from its pedestal. An empty whiskey barrel next to the statue led many to joke that Dutchy had gotten drunk and fallen. The next day, the statue was buried in the square, facing face-down. The decision to bury the statue rather than remove it may have been due to the statue's large size, with Dutchy weighing about 3,000 pounds (1,400 kg). Following Dutchy's removal, a tin statue of a Confederate soldier was erected as a replacement.

=== Recovery ===
On April 19, 1982, Dutchy was dug up as part of a project by the Elberton Granite Association. Dutchy was found to be in good condition, and the statue was cleaned at a local car wash. Scenes from the statue's recovery and cleaning were later featured on the television series Mysteries at the Museum. Following this, the statue was placed on display at the Elberton Granite Museum and Exhibit, where it currently resides.

== See also ==
- 1898 in art
- List of Confederate monuments and memorials in Georgia
- Removal of Confederate monuments and memorials
