= List of memorials to John Adams =

Among the memorials to John Adams, Founding Father and second president of the United States, are the following:

== Buildings ==
- Adams House at Harvard University
- John Adams Building at the Library of Congress
- John Adams Birthplace
- John Adams Courthouse, Boston

== Counties ==
- Adams County, Idaho
- Adams County, Mississippi
- Adams County, Nebraska
- Adams County, Ohio
- Adams County, Pennsylvania
- Adams County, Washington
- Adams County, Iowa (named either for Adams or for John Quincy Adams)

== Media ==
- 1776, 1969 Broadway musical
- 1776, 1972 film adaptation of the musical
- "Sit Down, John", a song from the musical
- The Adams Chronicles, 1976 television miniseries
- John Adams, 2008 television miniseries

== Military vessels ==
- USS Adams (1799)
- USS John Adams (1799)
- USS John Adams (SSBN-620)

== Mountains ==
- Mount Adams (New Hampshire)
- Mount Adams (Washington)

== National parks ==
- Adams National Historical Park

== Towns ==
- Adams, New York

== Streets ==
- Adams Street, Brooklyn

== Other ==
- Adams Memorial (proposed)
- Included in the Memorial to the 56 Signers of the Declaration of Independence

== See also ==
- Adams High School (disambiguation)
- Presidential memorials in the United States
