= Testa, Hurwitz & Thibeault =

American law firm

- Headquarters: Boston
- No. of attorneys: 400
- Major practice areas: General practice
- Revenue: $450 million (2002)
- Date founded: 1973
- Company type: LLP
- Dissolved: 2005
- Website: www.tht.com

Testa, Hurwitz & Thibeault (officially Testa, Hurwitz & Thibeault, LLP) was a Boston-based law firm of approximately 400 attorneys at its peak in 2002 with revenues approaching $450 million. It dissolved in 2005 amid partner departures and the burst of the dot-com bubble.

The firm was founded in 1973 and grew into a powerhouse representing venture capital funds and startups that prospered during Boston's technology boom. Its notable clients included Digital Equipment Corporation, JBoss, Inc. and Teradyne, Inc. The firm's flagship practice was its fund formation and private equity group. In December 2004, the fund formation practice decamped to the Boston office of the New York firm Proskauer Rose, heralding the demise of Testa, Hurwitz. The firm's partners scattered to a number of firms, including Goodwin Procter and Choate, Hall & Stewart, among others.

Testa Hurwitz & Thibeault dissolved in 2005.
