= John S. Conway (artist) =

American sculptor

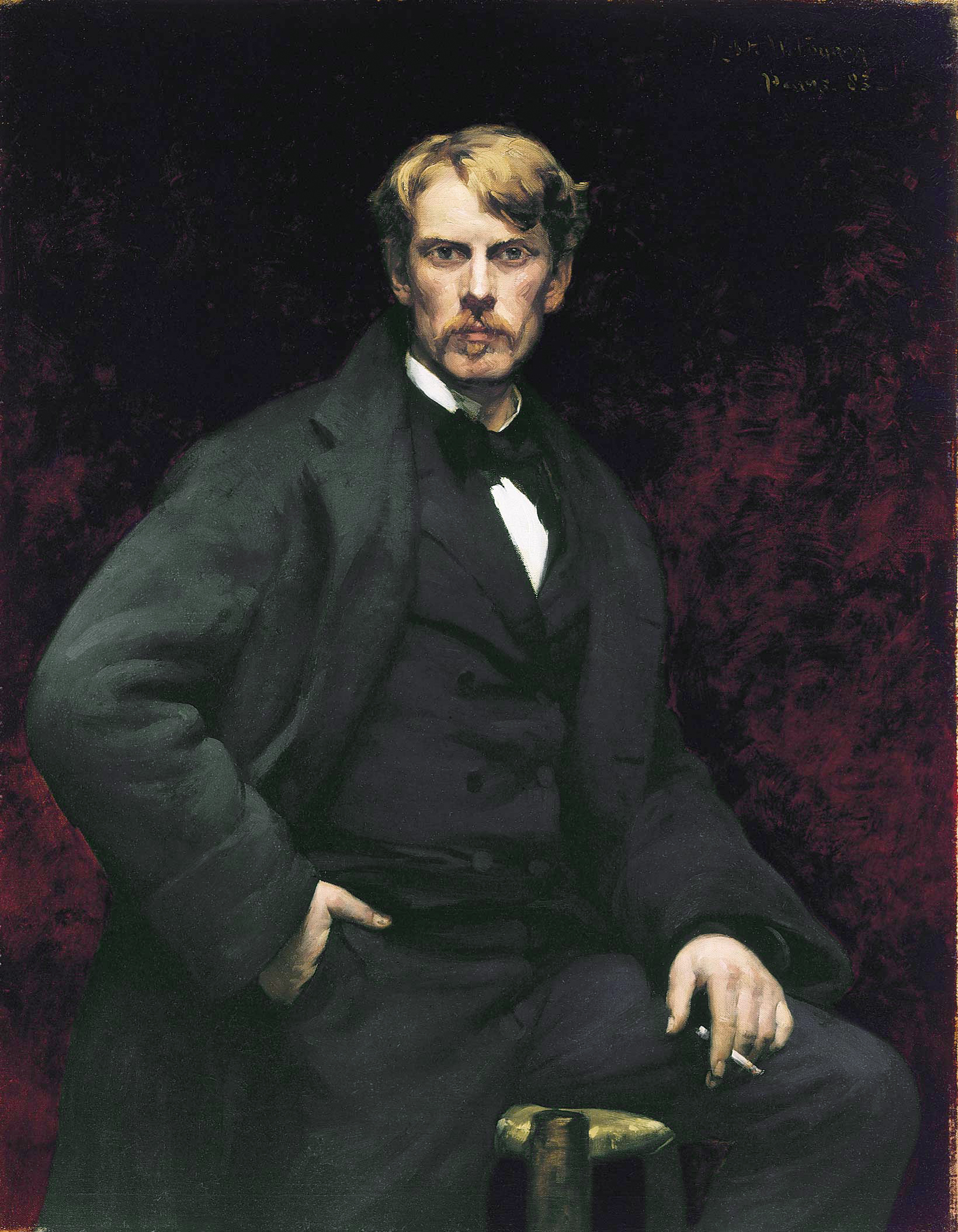
- John Severinus Conway (Robert Vonnoh, 1883)
- Born: February 21, 1852; Dayton, Ohio
- Died: December 25, 1925 (aged 73); Tenafly, New Jersey
- Occupation: American artist
- Known for: The Victorious Charge

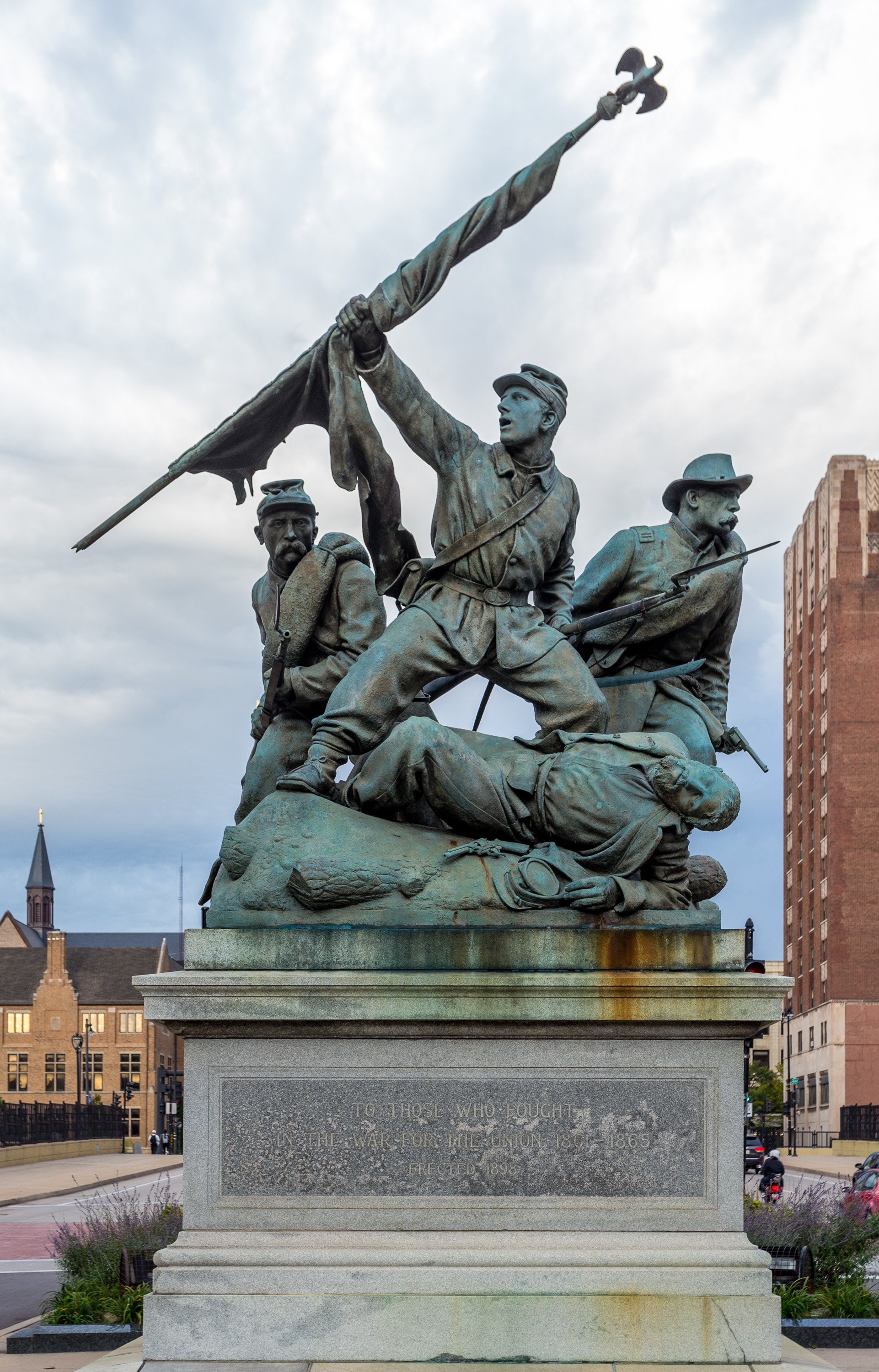
The Victorious Charge (1898)

John S. Conway, an artist and sculptor, was born February 21, 1852, in Dayton, Ohio. His middle name appears differently across various sources as Severinus, Severine, and Severino.

== Biography ==
Conway received his artistic training at the Art Institute of Chicago, the Académie Julien, and the École des Beaux-Arts. Conway also lived in Milwaukee, Italy, and New Jersey.

While Conway was in Paris, Robert William Vonnoh, a fellow art student, painted his portrait.

While in Italy, Conway married Agata Meloni. They had four children: George (1885–1967), Etheldreda (1887–1900), Mario (1889–1962), and Robert (1899–1972).

Conway's most famous work is the Milwaukee Soldiers Monument. The bronze sculpture, titled The Victorious Charge, was completed in Rome and shipped to Milwaukee. It stands in the median island on Wisconsin Avenue, between 8th and 10th Streets.

Conway returned to the United States in 1902. In 1904, he completed Oklahoma, another large sculpture, for the St. Louis Exposition. Some of his other works appear in museums, archives, and special collections, or occasionally come up for auction. Conway died December 25, 1925, at the age of 73 in his home in Tenafly, New Jersey.
