= The Victorious Charge =

Public artwork by John S. Conway

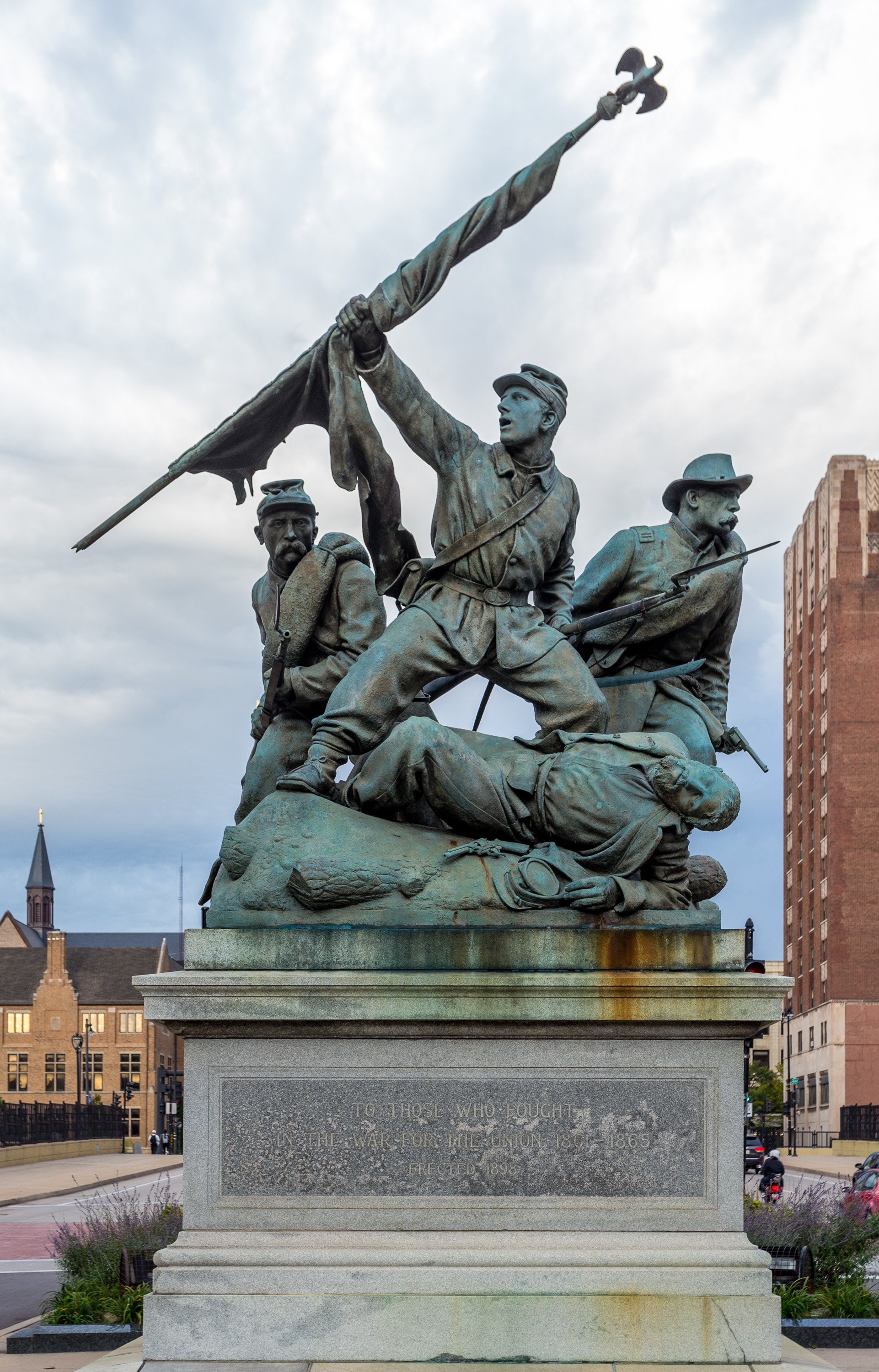
- Artist: John S. Conway
- Year: 1898
- Type: Bronze sculpture
- Dimensions: 300 cm × 610 cm (118 in × 240 in)
- Location: W. Wisconsin Ave. between N. 9th St. and N. 10th St., Milwaukee; 43°2′19.568″N 87°55′26.651″W
- Owner: City of Milwaukee

The Victorious Charge is a public artwork by American artist John S. Conway located on the Court of Honor on West Wisconsin Avenue in downtown Milwaukee, Wisconsin, United States. The 1898 bronze sculpture is 9'10" high and sits on a 20' square granite pedestal.

== Description ==
Conway's sculpture is the most important nineteenth century Civil War monument in Wisconsin. Four Union soldiers cast in bronze are caught in action, moving forward to victory. One of the soldiers has fallen and supports himself on his left arm, while grasping a piece of the flag staff in his right hand. A young private holds the flag high while stepping over the dying soldier. An officer with a pistol in one hand and a drawn sword in the other continues forward, while another private leans forward holding a bayonet.

There are various inscriptions on the work. The front of the base reads:
TO. THOSE. WHO. FOUGHT. IN. THE. WAR. FOR. THE. UNION. 1861-1865
ERECTED.1898.
The front lower left side of the sculpture reads
JOHN S. CONWAY SCULPTOR
and the back lower right reads
FOND CRESCENZI ROMA 1898.

Short video of The Victorious Charge

== History ==
Before The Victorious Charge, the standard for Civil War monuments was an idealized portrait of a soldier or an equestrian portrait of an officer. Conway revolutionized the Civil War memorial by depicting a realistic looking group of soldiers in action. His sculpture exudes energy and movement, faithfully capturing the intensity and horrors of battle.

Thirteen years passed from the moment that Alexander Mitchell agreed to finance a Civil War monument for the city of Milwaukee and the moment when Conway's sculpture was dedicated. Mitchell had not yet decided on a design for the monument when he died in 1887. His son, US senator John Mitchell, agreed to continue financing the project with the help of the Soldier's Memorial Committee. They decided on a design, but the financial panic of 1893 halted the project. Lydia Ely Hewitt, John S. Conway's friend, stepped in and devised different ways to raise the $30,000 necessary to erect the monument. She and other women held various fund-raising events including Miss Ely's famous autograph book.

As a final effort, she collected autographs from "famous Americans in government, science, art, and literature and compiled them into a giant autograph book two feet wide and two feet thick, with over 2,000 signatures, and with Conway's The Victorious Charge sketched on the title page. When the book was completed, Ely auctioned the single volume to Captain Frederick Pabst, the city's most prominent brewer, to complete the fundraising." Conway was thus able to complete his sculpture, which he had cast in bronze by the Crescenzi Foundry in Rome and sent across the Atlantic to Milwaukee.

The dedication of The Victorious Charge took place on June 28, 1898, coinciding with a four-day carnival celebrating the Golden Jubilee of Wisconsin's entry into the Union. Tens of thousands of visitors came to Milwaukee for the events. A band played "Marching Through Georgia" as Lydia Ely unveiled the sculpture, and Mayor David S. Rose accepted the monument on behalf of the city.

Although the sculpture was badly rusted, a complete restoration was completed in September 2003.

In 2014, the Westown Association announced a fundraiser to raise $100,000 to restore the Court of Honor statues, including The Victorious Charge, the Washington Monument and the Spanish–American War Soldier. The restored statue of Washington was unveiled in January 2018.
