= Stranded (painting) =

Painting by Alfred Munnings

- Artist: Alfred Munnings
- Year: 1898
- Type: Oil on canvas, genre painting
- Dimensions: 45.7 cm × 35.5 cm (18.0 in × 14.0 in)
- Location: City Museum and Art Gallery, Bristol

Stranded is an 1898 oil painting by the British artist Alfred Munnings. It depicts the painter's young cousins Nina and Cecil in a rowing boat having using an oar to free themselves from weeds and sedges with which they have become entangled in the shallow water. It was produced on a stretch of the River Waveney near Mendham.

Painted when he was around twenty, Munnings was the sun of a Suffolk windmill owner. Through his training in Norwich he had absorbed Impressionist and en plein air techniques and later attended the Académie Julian in Paris. The painting was one of two he displayed at the Royal Academy Exhibition of 1899 held at Burlington House in London, his debut at the prestigious institution. In 1944 he would be elected President of the Royal Academy having become celebrated for his equestrian paintings. The picture was acquired by Bristol Art Gallery in 1933.

== Bibliography ==
- Goodman, Jean. AJ: The Life of Alfred Munnings. Erskine Press, 2019.
- Hedley, Lillian, Mendes-Mourao, Maria, Collell, Carmen & Greenacre, Francis. An Anthology of Victorian and Edwardian Paintings from the Collection of the City Art Gallery, Bristol. City Art Gallery, 1975.
- McConkey, Kenneth. Impressionism in Britain. Yale University Press, 1995.
