= Pemberton Square =

Mixed-use Boston area

Coordinates: 42°21′31.19″N 71°03′41.44″W

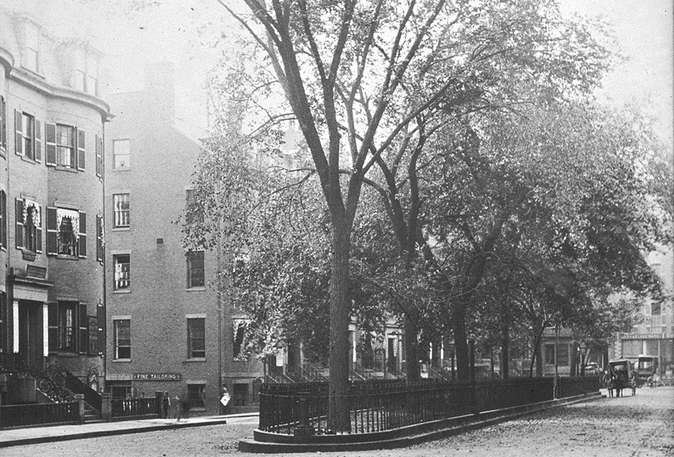
Pemberton Square, Boston, 1875

Pemberton Square (est. 1835) in the Government Center area of Boston, Massachusetts, was developed by P.T. Jackson in the 1830s as an architecturally uniform mixed-use enclave surrounding a small park. In the mid-19th century both private residences and businesses dwelt there. The construction in 1885 of the massive John Adams Courthouse changed the scale and character of the square, as did the Center Plaza building in the 1960s.

== History ==
=== 1835–1885 ===
In the mid-1830s land on Cotton Hill (also called Pemberton Hill) between Tremont Street and Somerset Street was developed as Phillips Place, "laid out on the estates late of the heirs of Messrs. [Jonathan] Phillips, [Gardiner] Greene, and [James] Lloyd." "After Greene's death in 1832, Patrick Tracy Jackson ... purchased the property. Jackson ... cut down the top of Pemberton Hill in order to create a desirable residential area halfway down the slope, at the point where the mansion had stood. This massive grading operation took only 5 months and was completed in October of 1835." The fill was used to reclaim the North Cove, which became the Bullfinch Triangle neighborhood of streets.

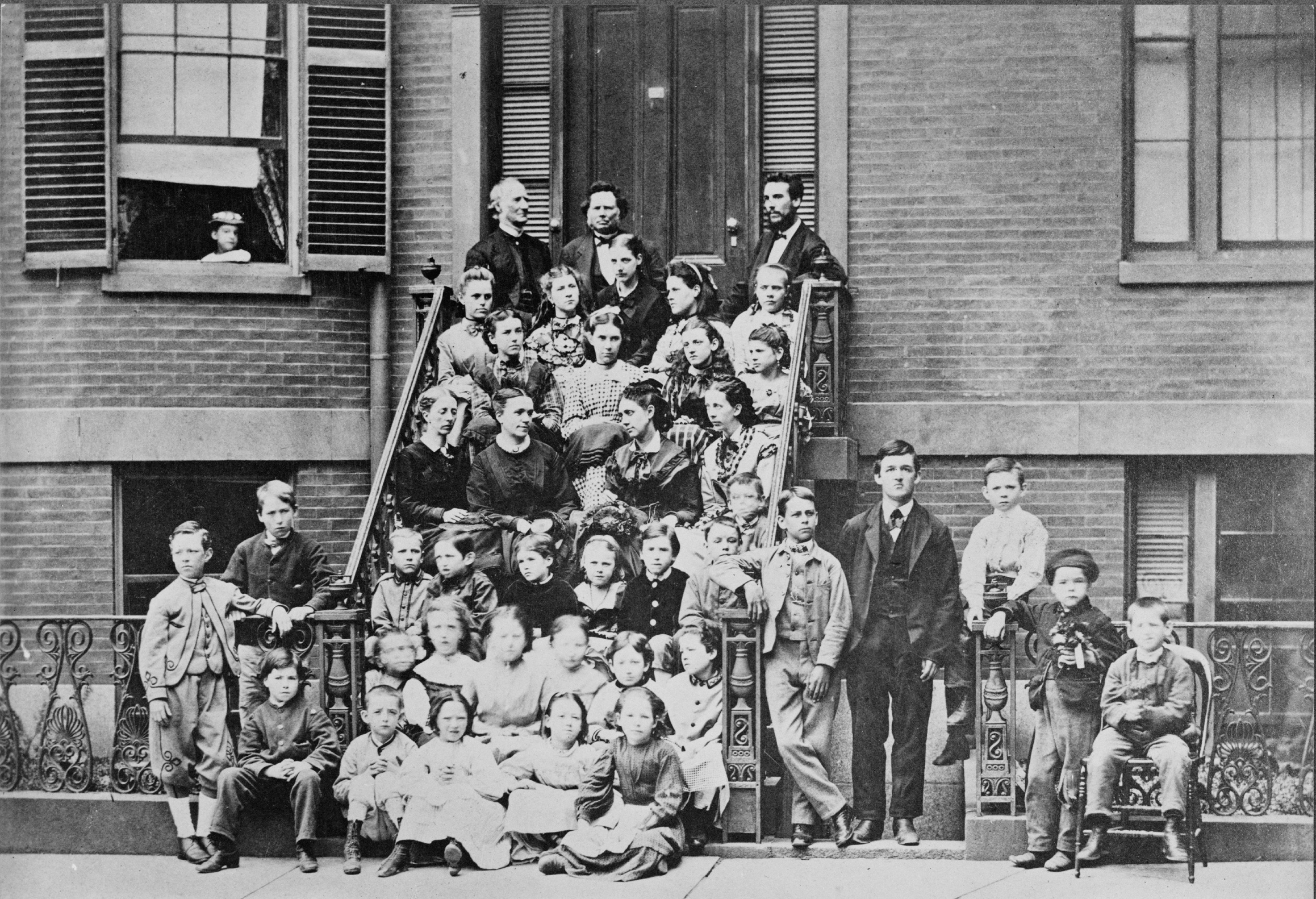
Boston School for the Deaf; Alexander Graham Bell, seated on top step with Dexter King, Ira Allen; three steps down are teachers Annie M. Bond, Sarah Fuller, Ellen L. Barton, Mary H. True, students seated on steps and standing on sidewalk, Pemberton Square, 1871

"Jackson sponsored a design competition for developing his property. ... Alexander Wadsworth, a local civil engineer and surveyor and one of 47 entrants, won the $500 prize." "In 1836, Jackson commissioned George Minot Dexter (1802–1872) to design the houses for Pemberton Square and all the accompanying ironwork (stair railings, fences for the small front yards, and the fence with lampposts for the central garden). ... The buildings would be consistent in style and ornamentation."

In 1838 the city named the site "Pemberton Square." Somewhat confusedly, the area later known as Scollay Square was first called "Pemberton Square" in February 1838; the city changed the name to "Scollay Square" in June 1838, to accommodate the newly developed area across the street on Pemberton Hill. The two squares sat very near one another, with Pemberton set back from Scollay, and accessed by a short connecting street.

"The dwellings built in it were fine, indeed elegant for their time, and for many years it was the residence of some of the most substantial citizens. ... Architects, lawyers, and other professional men were among the first to establish their offices in it; then other business worked in, and a number of city and state offices, notably the headquarters of the board of police commissioners." "In the middle of the square [was] an enclosed green, with a few trees, which ... was a pleasant bit of nature for the eye of the city man to rest upon." During the city's Water Celebration in 1848, "the cavalcade [passed] up Park, down Beacon and Somerset Street, to Pemberton Square."

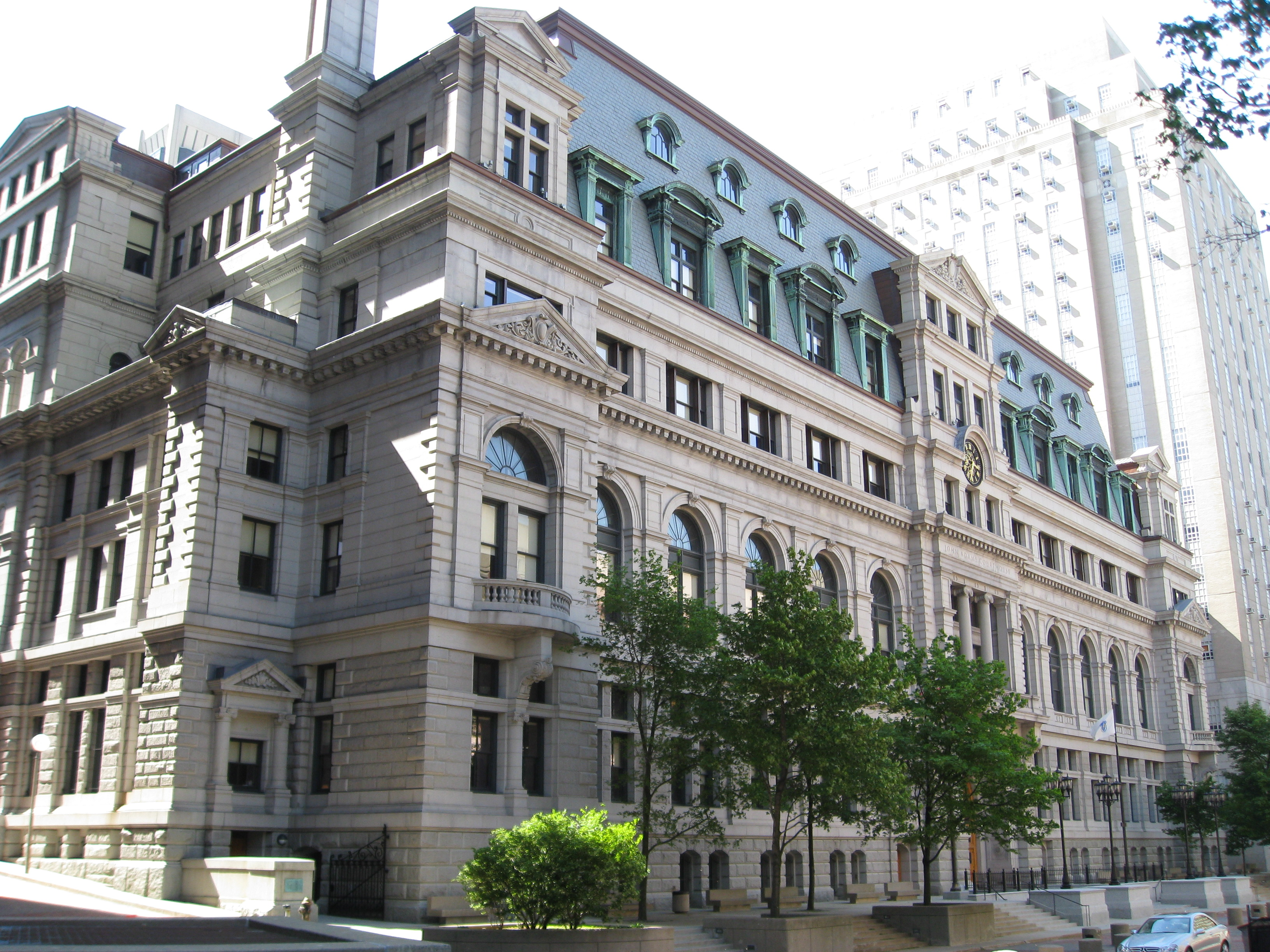
Suffolk County Courthouse (now called John Adams Courthouse), built 1885 (photo 2008)

=== 1885–present ===
"In 1885 the square was selected as the site for a new court house, the building of which had been agitated for years." "Houses on the west side ... were razed in 1885 to make way for the Suffolk County Courthouse. ... The garden was also eliminated at that time" By 1895, "some of the old swell-front houses remain, used as public and law offices."

Since the 1960s, Pemberton Square has become part of the complex of overscale buildings known as Government Center. "A few of the square's original dwellings on the east side survived until the autumn of 1969, when they, along with 2 more recent office buildings, were demolished and replaced by Center Plaza, a very long office building. The form of Center Plaza mirrores the entire crescent-shaped span of the original houses on the east side of the square, but the square itself no longer exists."

== Tenants ==
Notable residents of Pemberton Square in the 19th century included:

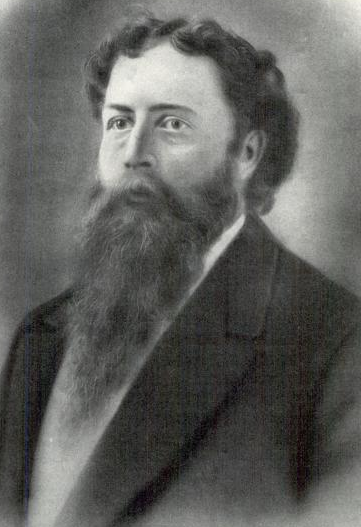
Louis P. Rogers, architect, 19th century

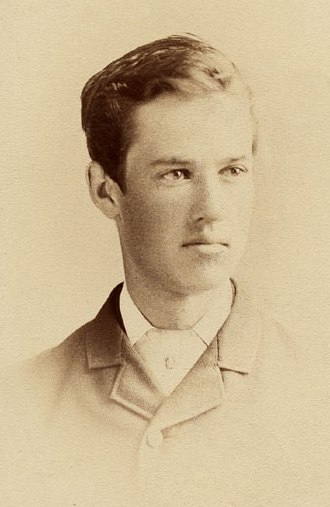
Cyrus Dallin, sculptor of Paul Revere

- American Board of Commissioners for Foreign Missions
- American Colonization Society
- American Social Science Association
- Boston Conservatory of Elocution, Oratory, and Dramatic Art, later Emerson College
- Boston Police Department
- Boston School for Deaf-Mutes, later the Horace Mann School for the Deaf and Hard of Hearing
- Boston Society of Architects
- Boston University's "executive building, Jacob Sleeper Hall"
- Cummings and Sears, architects
- Cyrus Dallin, sculptor
- Forest Hills Cemetery office
- Gridley James Fox Bryant and Louis P. Rogers, architects
- Edward Clarke Cabot, architect
- George Barrell Emerson
- Lee & Follen, landscape architects (Francis L. Lee and Charles Follen)
- Massachusetts Society for the Prevention of Cruelty to Children
- Mount Auburn Cemetery office
- John Plumbe, daguerreotypist
- Henry Vaughan (architect)
- Ware & Van Brunt, architects
- Wesley Webber, painter

== Images ==
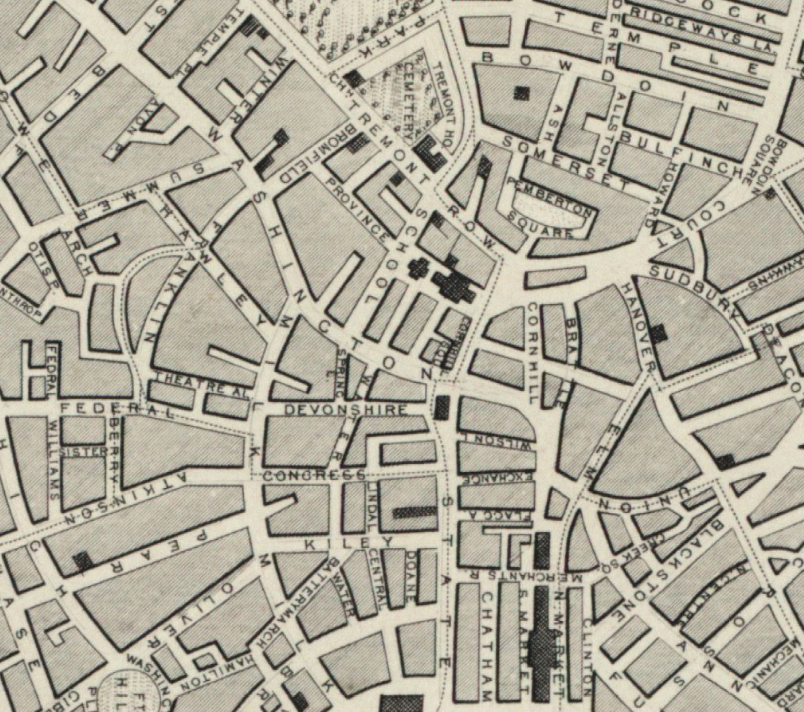
Detail of 1838 map of Boston, showing Pemberton Square

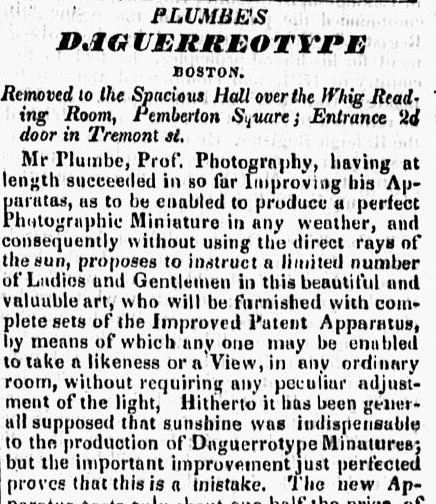
Detail of advertisement for Plumbe's daguerreotypes, in "the spacious hall over the Whig Reading Room, Pemberton Square," 1841

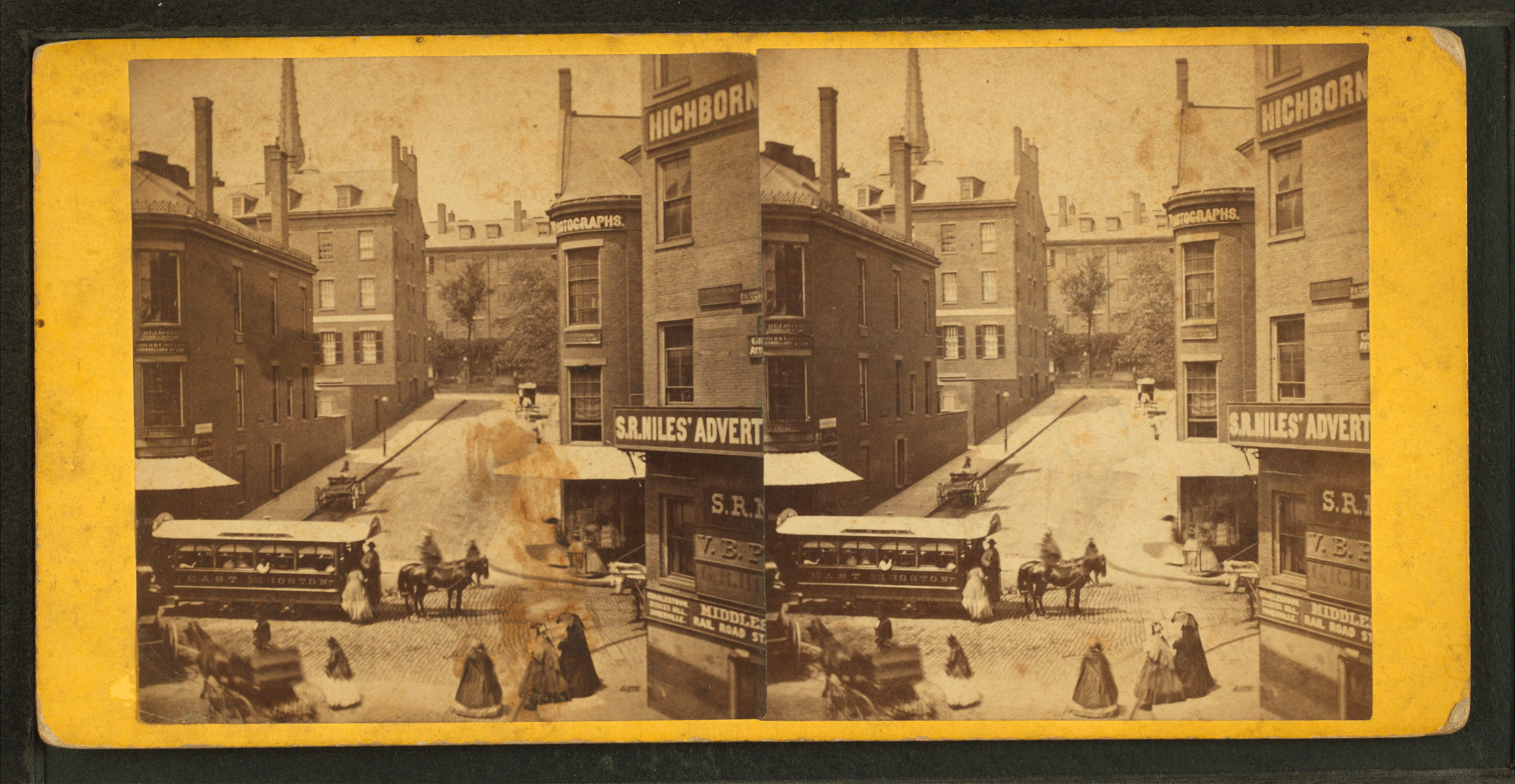
Scollay Square, looking up to Pemberton Square, Boston, c. 1860s

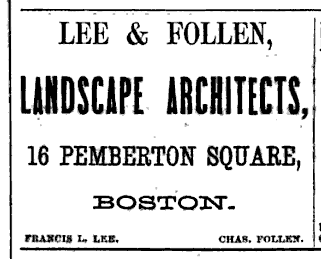
Advertisement for Lee & Follen, landscape architects, 1868

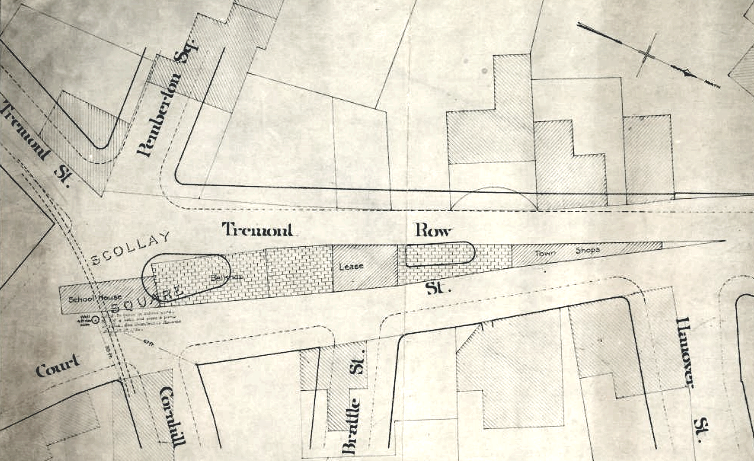
Map of Pemberton Square, Court St. and vicinity. Boston, 1895.

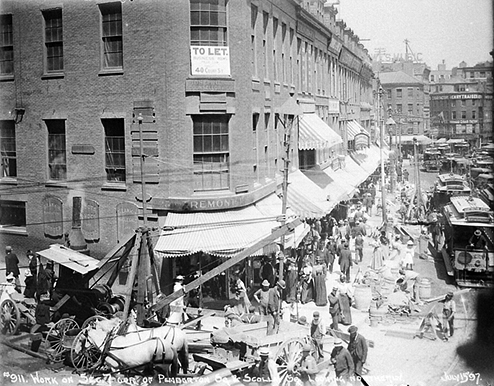
Corner near Scollay Square and Pemberton Square, Boston, 1897

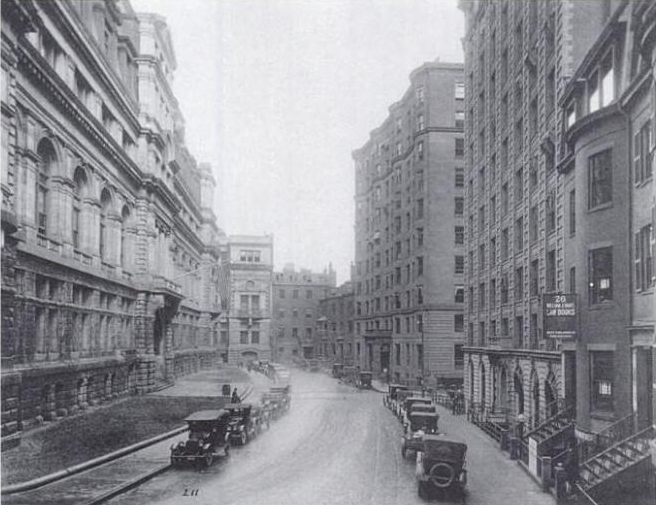
Pemberton Sq.; Adams courthouse (at left), c. 1920

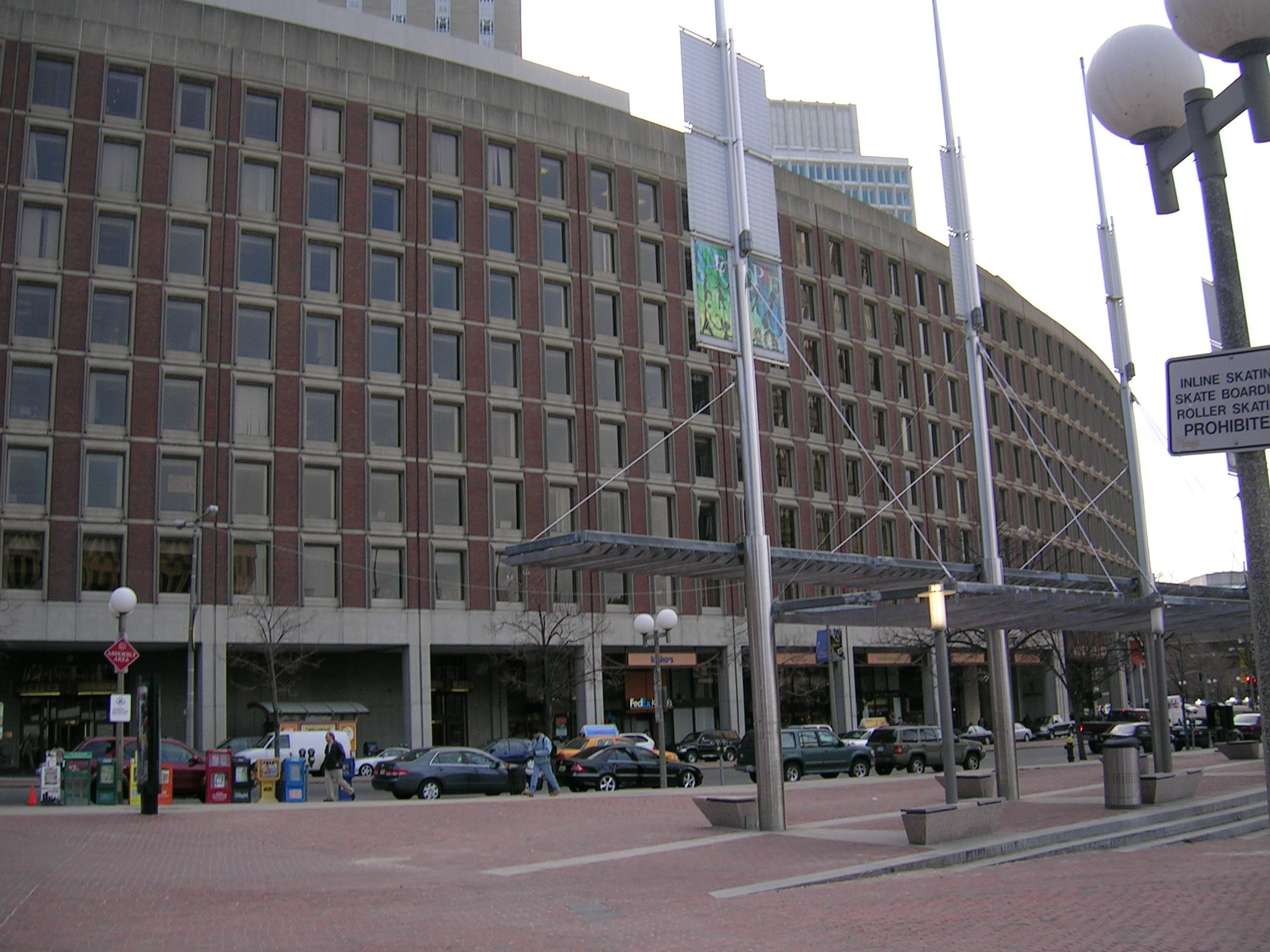
Center Plaza building at Pemberton Square, looking across Tremont St. from City Hall Plaza, 2005

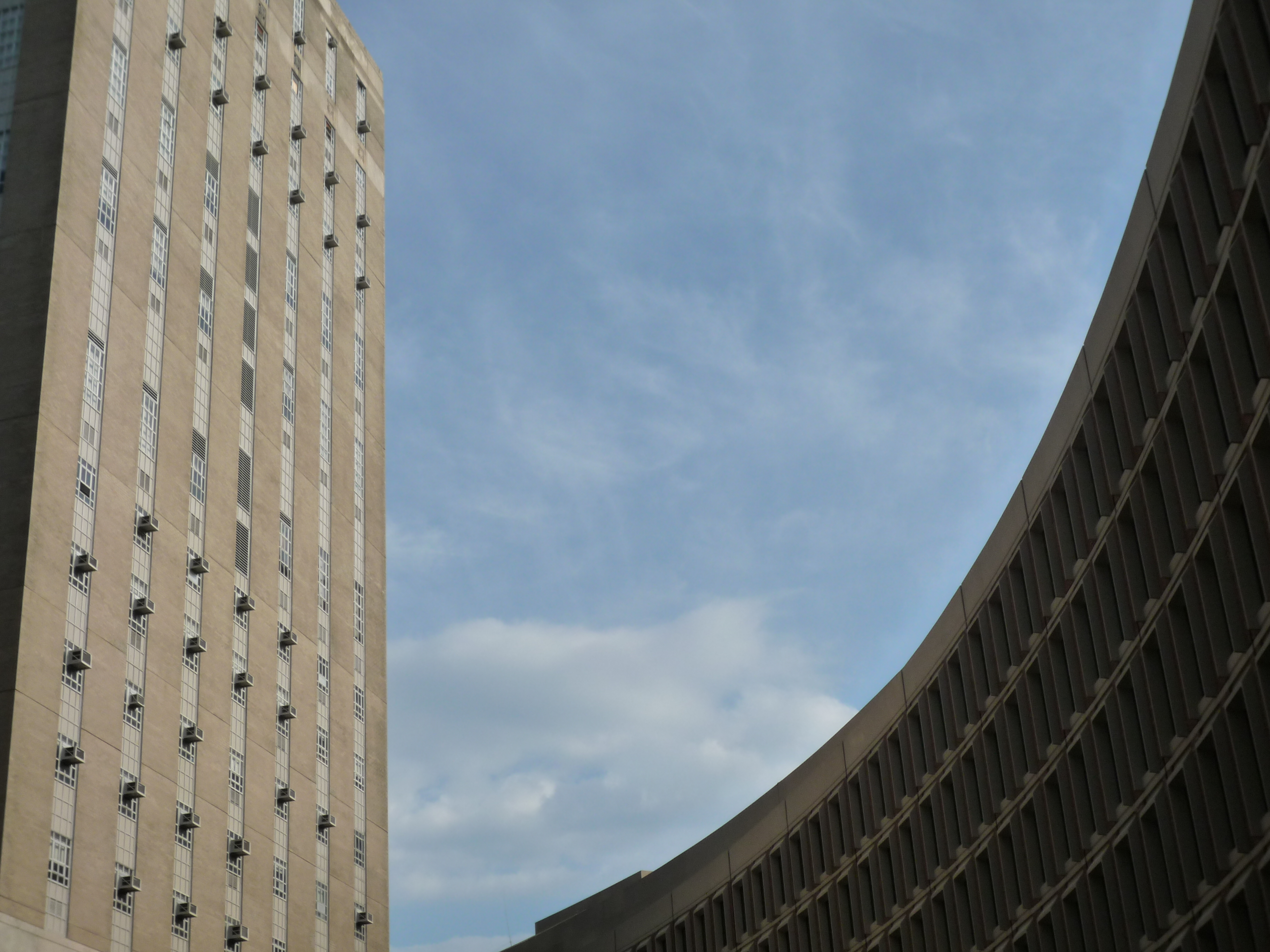
Center Plaza building (at right), 2009

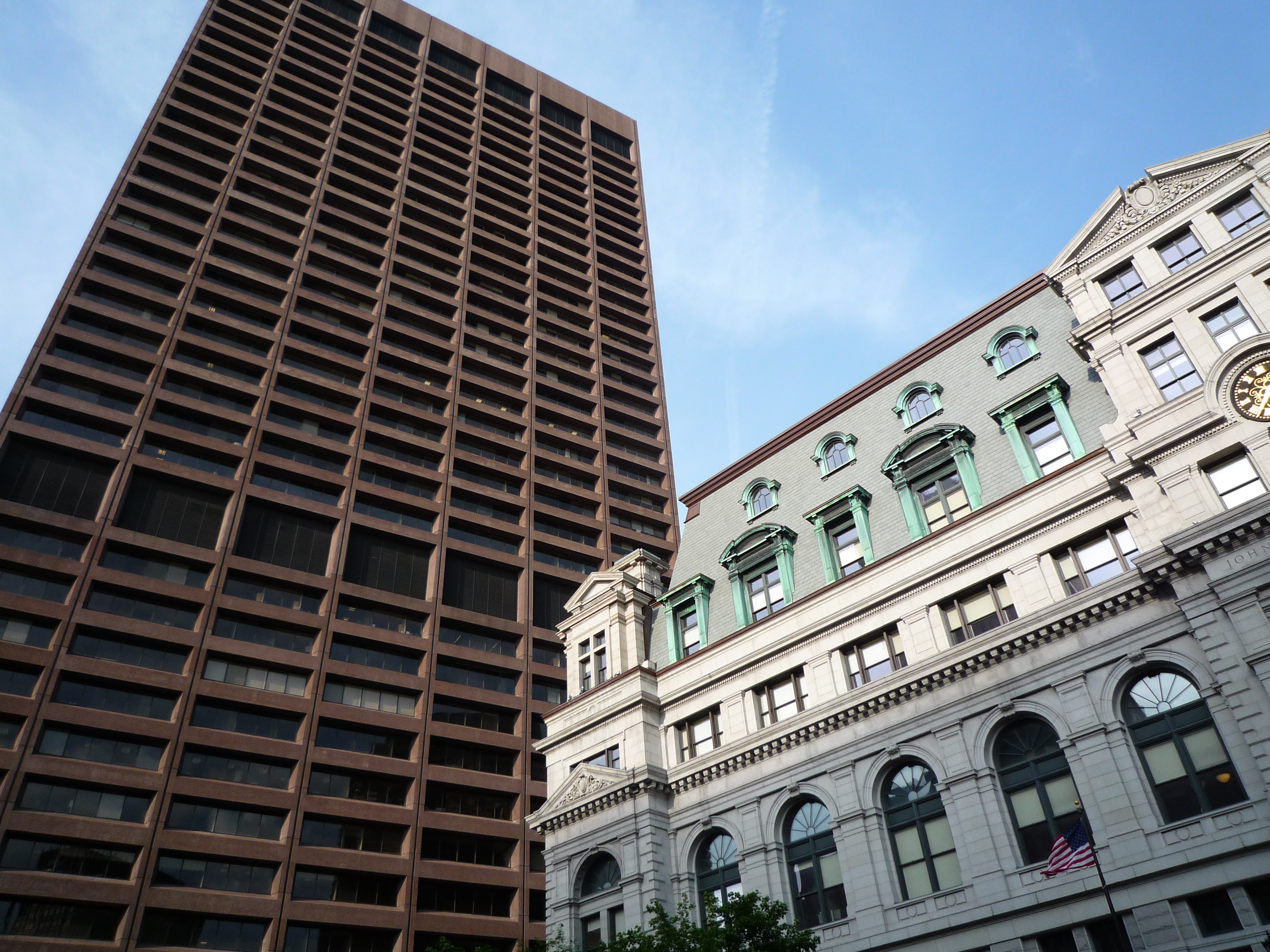
Adams courthouse (at right), 2009

== See also ==
- Gardiner Greene, former owner of land on Pemberton's Hill, later developed as Pemberton Square
- Massachusetts Appeals Court, housed in Suffolk County Courthouse
- Massachusetts Supreme Judicial Court, housed in Suffolk County Courthouse
- Social Law Library, housed in Suffolk County Courthouse
- Suffolk County Courthouse, built 1893
