= Fritz Skade =

Friedrich Skade (17 June 1898 – 4 April 1971) was a German painter and printmaker.

== Life ==
Skade was born in Döhlen. He attended the preparatory school at the Dresden School of Arts and Crafts from 1912 to 1916. He served in the First World War from 1916 to 1918. From 1918 to 1922, he continued his studies at the Academy of Arts and Crafts under instructors including Paul Hermann and Paul Rößler. After completing his studies at the Academy of Arts and Crafts, Skade transferred to the Dresden Academy of Fine Arts. From 1922, he was a master student under Richard Dreher.

Skade was a member of the artist group Die Schaffenden. He first exhibited his work at the Juryfreie Kunstausstellung (Jury-free Art Exhibition) in Berlin in 1924. He became a member of the Dresdner Sezession 1925/26 and joined the KPD (Communist Party of Germany) in 1926. In 1927, he received the Saxon State Prize for Painting, followed by the prize for mural painting in 1929. In 1930, he became a member of the Assoziation revolutionärer bildender Künstler and published illustrations in the Arbeiterstimme. Furthermore, he was a member of the Freie Künstlerschaft Sachsen and belonged to the core group of the Dresdner Sezession 1932

During the Nazi era, Skade was a member of the Reich Chamber of Fine Arts. His participation in nine major exhibitions during this period is documented. He joined the NSDAP on May 1, 1933 (membership number 2,380,390). In 1937, as part of the Germany-wide concerted campaign against Degenerate Art, Skade's oil paintings Damenbildnis (Portrait of a Lady) and Frauenbildnis (Portrait of a Woman)—which did not conform to the Nazi art canon—were confiscated from the Dresden City Museum (Stadtmuseum Dresden). Both works were displayed in several cities as part of the traveling exhibition Degenerate Art. Their whereabouts remain unknown.

After the outbreak of the Second World War, Skade was conscripted into the Wehrmacht; he served in the war and was taken prisoner. During the air raids on Dresden in 1945, his studio—located in the building of the Saxon Higher Administrative Court at Antonsplatz 1, where he also resided—was destroyed.

From 1945 to 1951, Skade lived and worked in Löwenhain. In 1947, he was a founding member of the artist group Das Ufer, initiated by Siegfried Donndorf, and participated in several of its exhibitions, as well as the "First Exhibition of Dresden Artists" (Erste Ausstellung Dresdner Künstler) in 1947. During this period, he produced several commissioned works for enterprises and institutions that aligned with political objectives. For instance, his painting Ernst Thälmann Speaks at the Dresden Velodrome was created in 1951 as part of a commission by the Saxon state government.

Skade was a member of the Association of Visual Artists of the GDR. In 1968, he received the Patriotic Order of Merit.

Skade died in Dresden in 1971 and was buried in the Loschwitz Cemetery.

== Museums and public collections containing works by Skade ==
- Altenburg: Lindenau-Museum
- Dresden: Galerie Neue Meister
- Dresden: Kunstfonds des Freistaats Sachsen
- Kamenz: Museum der Westlausitz
