= Reinhold Felderhoff =

German sculptor (1865–1919)

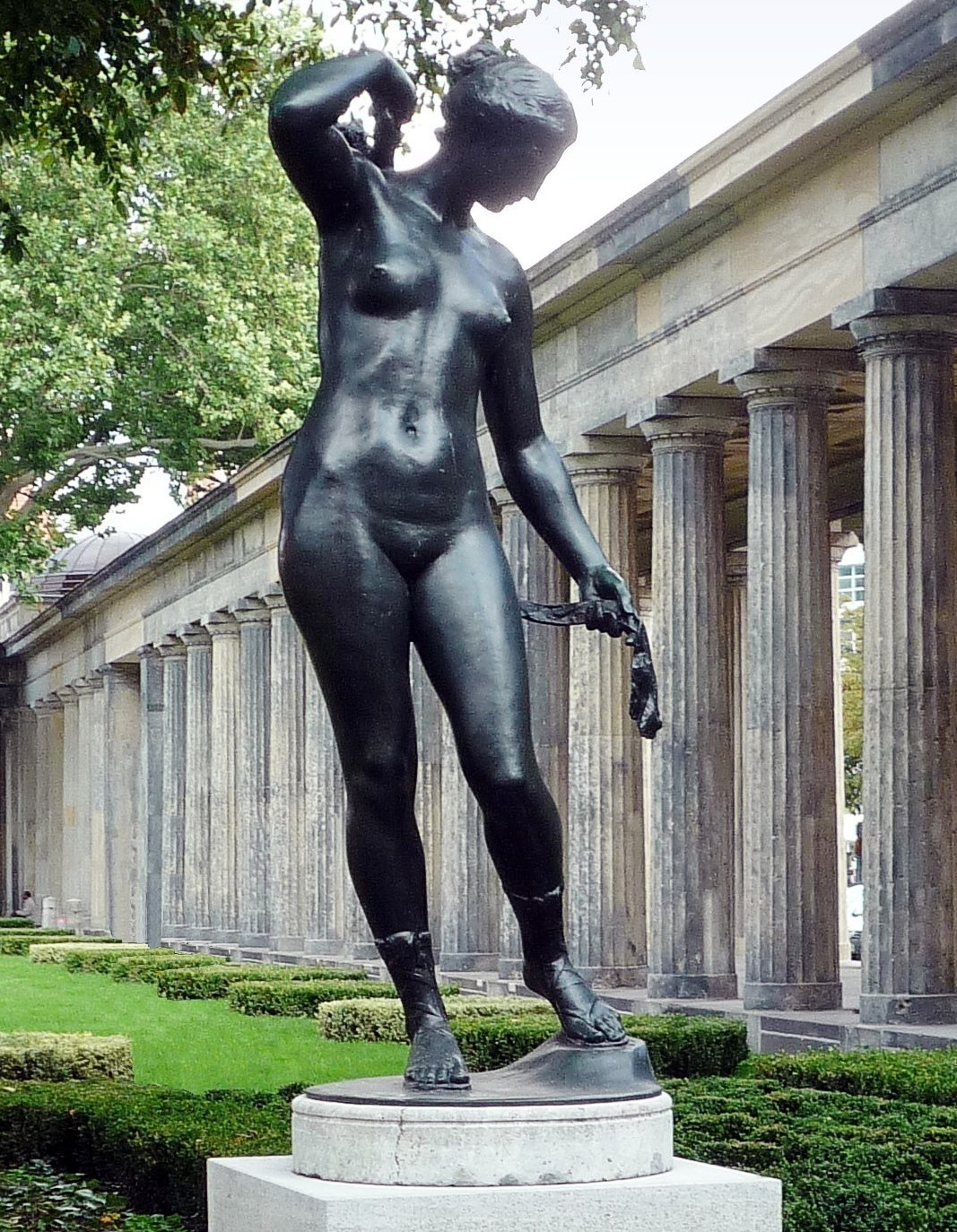
Diana, in the Colonnade Park of Museum Island

Reinhold Carl Thusmann Felderhoff (25 February 1865 – 18 December 1919) was a German sculptor and medallist.

== Life ==
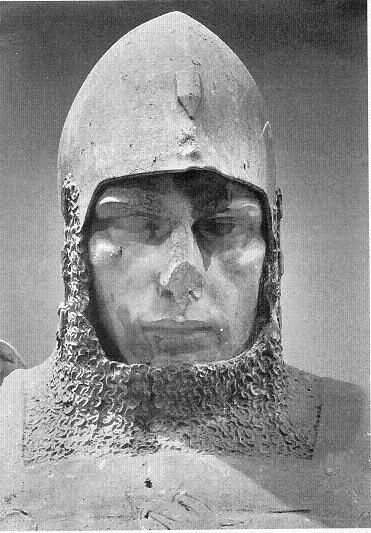
Close-up of Johann II, showing damage from World War II

Felderhoff was born in Elbing, West Prussia (Elbląg, Poland). He entered the Prussian Academy of Arts in 1880 and studied there under Fritz Schaper until 1884, after which he became a Master Student in the studio of Reinhold Begas. In 1885, he spent a year in Rome on a scholarship, then returned for more work with Begas, remaining there through 1888, although he was doing free-lance work as early as 1887 and won a government contract to sculpt busts of famous generals for the Berlin Armory (Zeughaus, now the German Historical Museum).

1890 and 1891 brought another stay in Rome. He then helped his mentor, Begas, to complete the National Kaiser Wilhelm Monument, for which he received a medal in 1897.

Felderhoff joined the Berlin Secession and became a member of the Academy in 1913. He was named a Professor there in 1917 and died in Berlin in 1919. He is buried in the Stahnsdorf South-Western Cemetery.

== Work ==
His model of Albert the Bear drew praise in 1893, when it was entered in a competition to provide figures for the Fisherman's Bridge. Although the contract went to Johannes Boese, it enabled Felderhoff to negotiate a commission for a statue and busts in the Siegesallee project and was used as the basis for the central figure; Johann II, Margrave of Brandenburg (Group 6). He was the only Siegesallee sculptor to work in an austere modern style, rather than the favored historical style. (Some changes were made when Kaiser Wilhelm reviewed the sketches, but their nature is unknown). This caused his work to be criticized as "mediocre".

One of his best-known works is the statue of Diana, which was displayed at the Exposition Universelle (1900). It has been reproduced and recast many times.

== Other selected projects ==
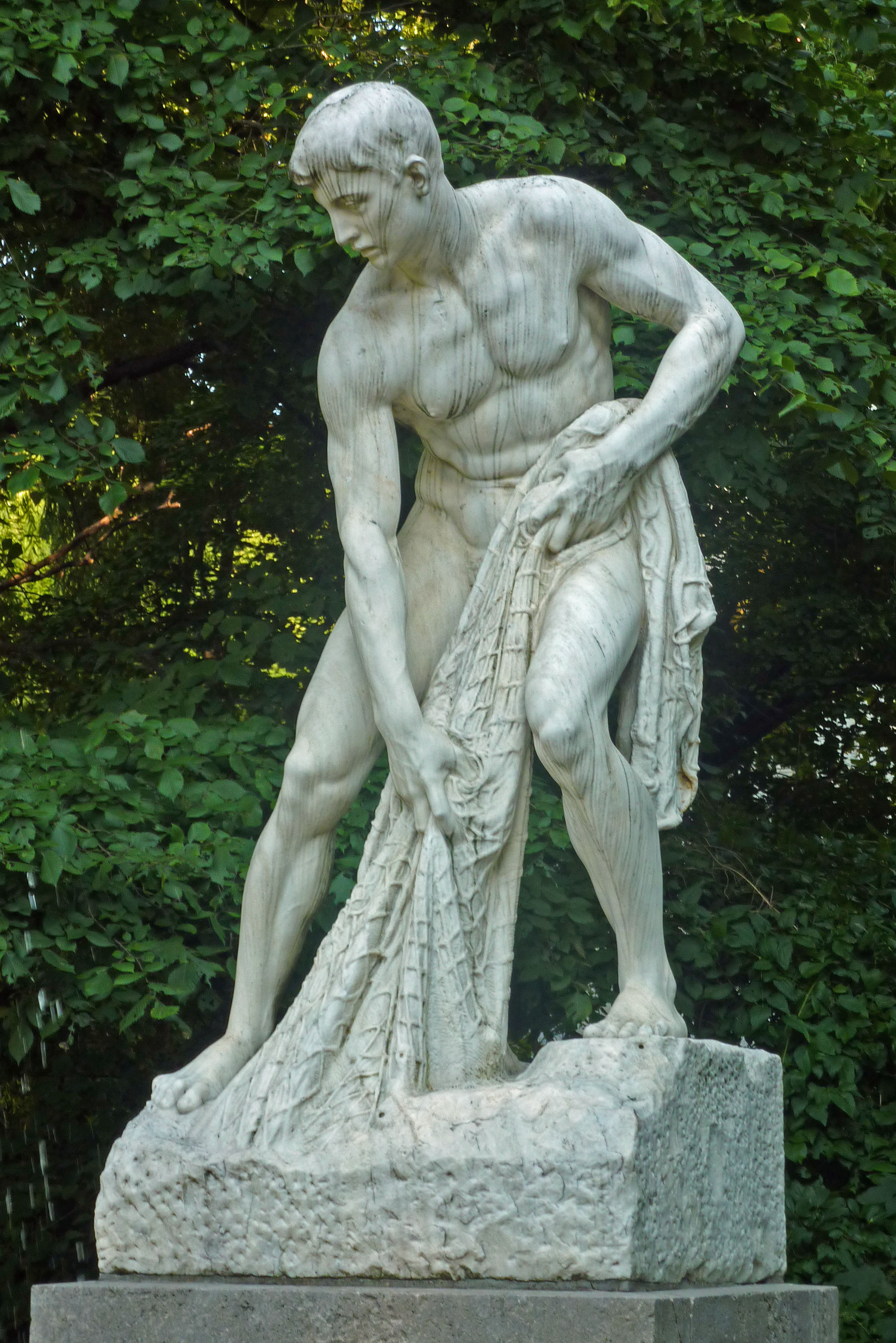
Stralauer Fischer (1916)

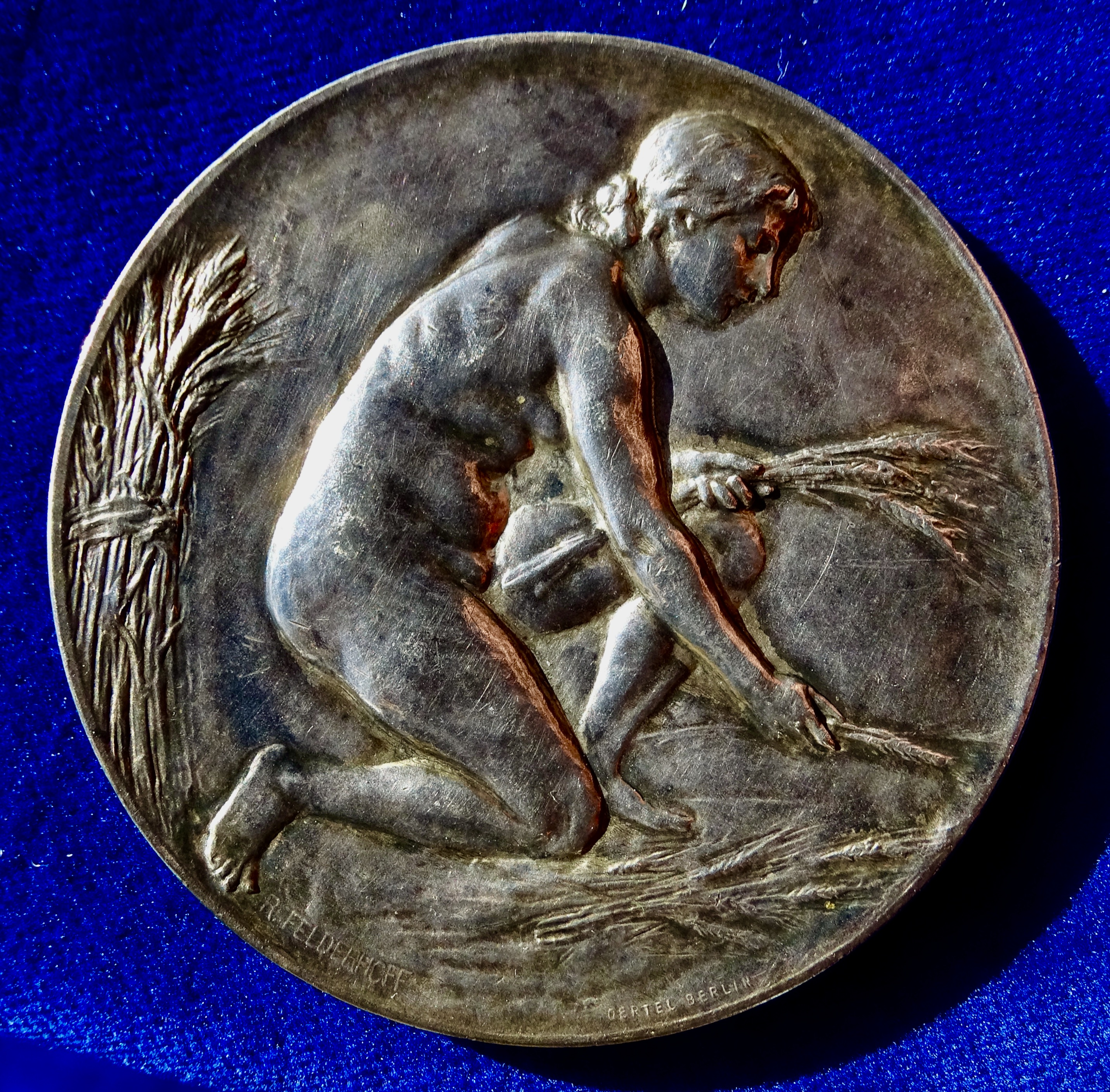
1908 university award medal of Technische Hochschule Berlin

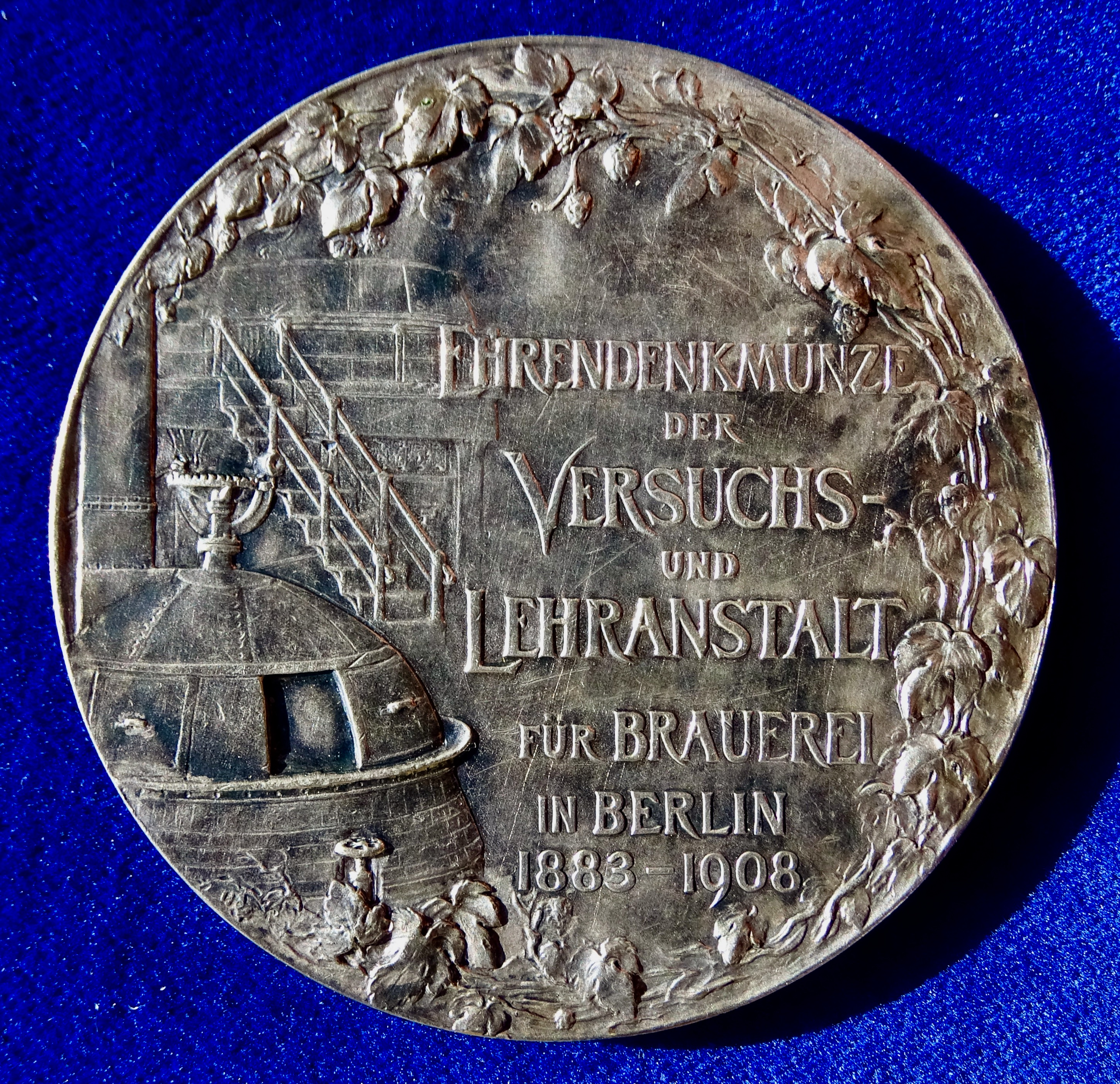
The reverse of this medal showing the Institute of Technology Brewing and Malting

Berlin

- 1895: Die Eitelkeit (Vanity); statue for the wardrobe of the Reichstag building.
- 1898/1899: Seated figure of Wilhelm Conrad Röntgen; on the Potsdam Bridge (dismantled and melted in 1945)
- 1904: Two large stone benches with hunting motifs; (Tiergarten, destroyed).
- 1916: Stralauer Fischer; originally part of a fountain, now at the corner of Neue Krugallee 4 and Bulgarische Straße.

Other cities

- 1894–1899: The Bismarck Monument; Essen.
- 1901: Seated figure of Johannes Brahms; in the vestibule of the Brahms Institute at the Lübeck Academy of Music.
- 1903: Amphitrite Fountain; Stettin (Szczecin)(destroyed)
