= Gold v. Eddy =

1 Mass. 1 (1804)
- Court: Massachusetts Supreme Judicial Court
- Full case name: THOMAS GOLD, Plaintiff in Review vs. JOSHUA EDDY, Administrator
- Argued: September Term 1804
- Decided: September Term 1804
- Citation: 1 Mass. 1 (1804)

Case history
- Subsequent action: none

Holding
- In an action by the endorser against the promisor of a promissory note negotiated subsequent to the day of payment, the defendant may go into such evidence as he would have been entitled to had the action been brought by the original promisee. The deposition of a person used in a former trial is competent evidence in a review, though the deponent is a party to the suit, having become administrator of one of the original parties.

Court membership
- Chief judge: Francis Dana
- Associate judges: Simeon Strong, Theodore Sedgwick, Samuel Sewall, George Thacher

Laws applied
- Acts of 1788, ch. 47; Acts of 1786, ch. 66

Gold v. Eddy, 1 Mass. 1 (1804), was the first recorded case in the official reports of the Massachusetts Supreme Judicial Court.

== Ruling ==
According to the reporter's summation:

In an action by the endorser against the promisor of a promissory note negotiated subsequent to the day of payment, the defendant may go into such evidence as he would have been entitled to had the action been brought by the original promisee. The deposition of a person used in a former trial is competent evidence in a review, though the deponent is a party to the suit, having become administrator of one of the original parties.
