= John Adams Courthouse =

Courthouse in Boston, Massachusetts

- U.S. National Register of Historic Places
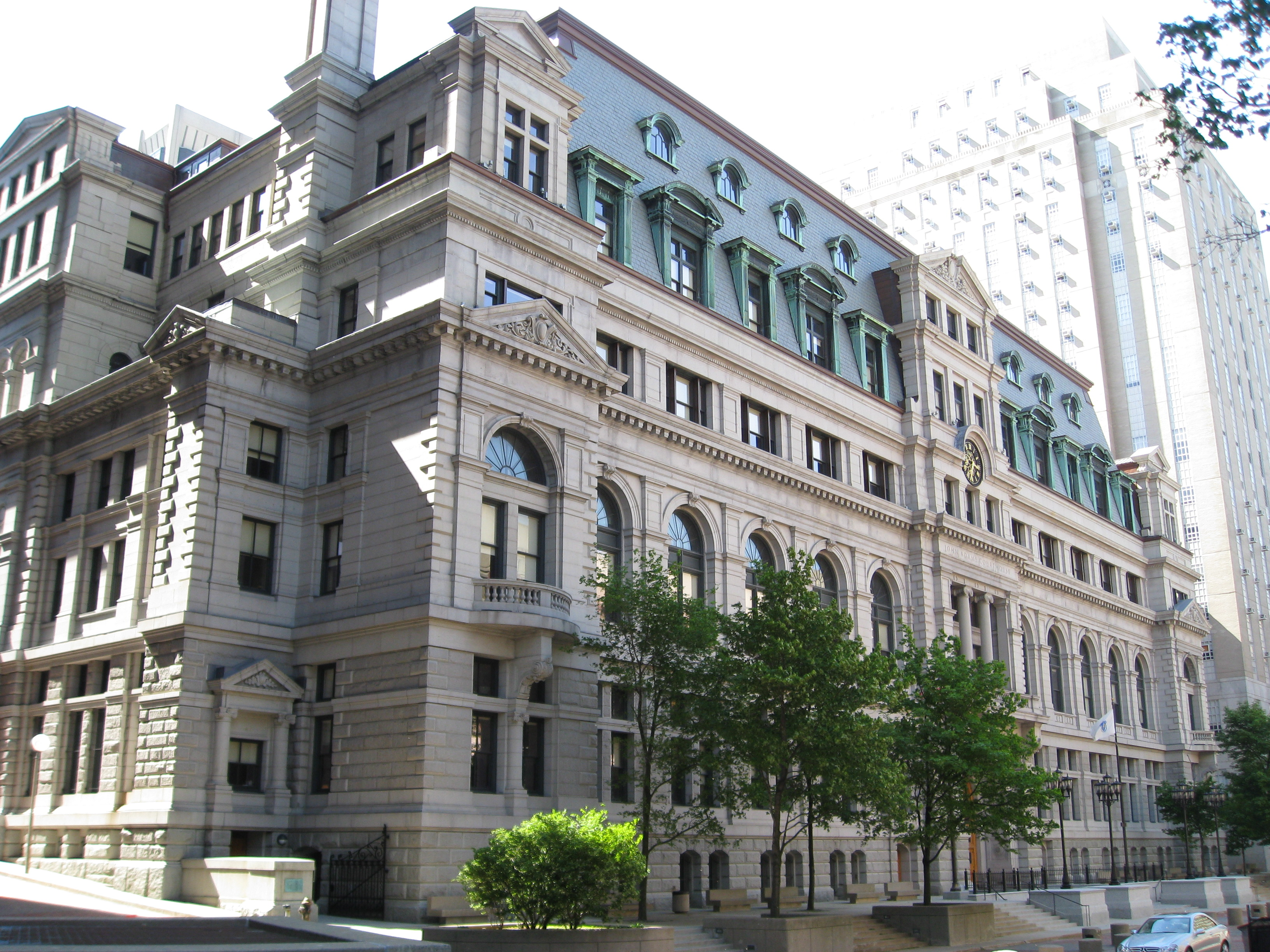
- Suffolk County Courthouse in Boston

- Location within Boston Location within Massachusetts Location within the United States
- Location: 3 Pemberton Square, Boston, Massachusetts, U.S.
- Coordinates: 42°21′32.75″N 71°3′40.5″W
- Area: 2 acres (0.81 ha)
- Built: 1894; 132 years ago
- Architect: George A. Clough
- Architectural style: Second Empire
- NRHP reference No.: 74000391
- Added to NRHP: May 8, 1974

The John Adams Courthouse, formerly the Suffolk County Courthouse, is a historic courthouse building in Pemberton Square in Boston, Massachusetts. Originally serving as the courthouse for Suffolk County, Massachusetts, it is home to the Massachusetts Supreme Judicial Court (the state's highest court) and the Massachusetts Appeals Court. Built in 1893, it was the major work of Boston's first city architect, George Clough, and is one of the city's few surviving late-19th-century monumental civic buildings. It was added to the National Register of Historic Places in 1974.

== Description ==
The John Adams Courthouse is located on the west side of Pemberton Square, now little more than an open plaza bounded by the courthouse on the west, and the backside of the curved Center Plaza building, which faces Tremont Street opposite the Boston City Hall plaza. The courthouse is a six-story granite structure, fifteen bays wide, with an eclectic stylistic composition. Its first 1-1/2 floor function by appearance as an elevated basement, with small arched windows close to the ground, above which are larger rectangular windows divided in the upper third by a stone stringcourse. Above this basement level is an arcaded mezzanine of large round-arch openings in which paired sash windows are topped by a half-round transom. A dentillated cornice separates this level from a narrower band of three-part windows, above which is a two-level mansard roof pierced by a variety of dormers. There are projecting pavilions at the ends of the main facade, rising to the top of the mezzanine level on the sides, and the full roof height on the front.

== History ==
The courthouse was built in 1893 to a design by Boston city architect George Clough. Stylistically the building was described at the time as "German Renaissance"; it is now viewed as transitional between the monumental Second Empire style of Boston's Old City Hall and the Classical Revival. Of the many buildings Clough designed for the city, this is his largest and most elaborate design. Clough also designed the 1909 enlargement of the structure, which added the French Chateau-style roof.

From 1893 to 1938, the Supreme Judicial Court and the Social Law Library occupied the building, known then as the Suffolk County Courthouse. In 2002, the Supreme Judicial Court, the Massachusetts Appeals Court, and the Social Law Library returned to the restored building, which was renamed the John Adams Courthouse.

== Gallery ==
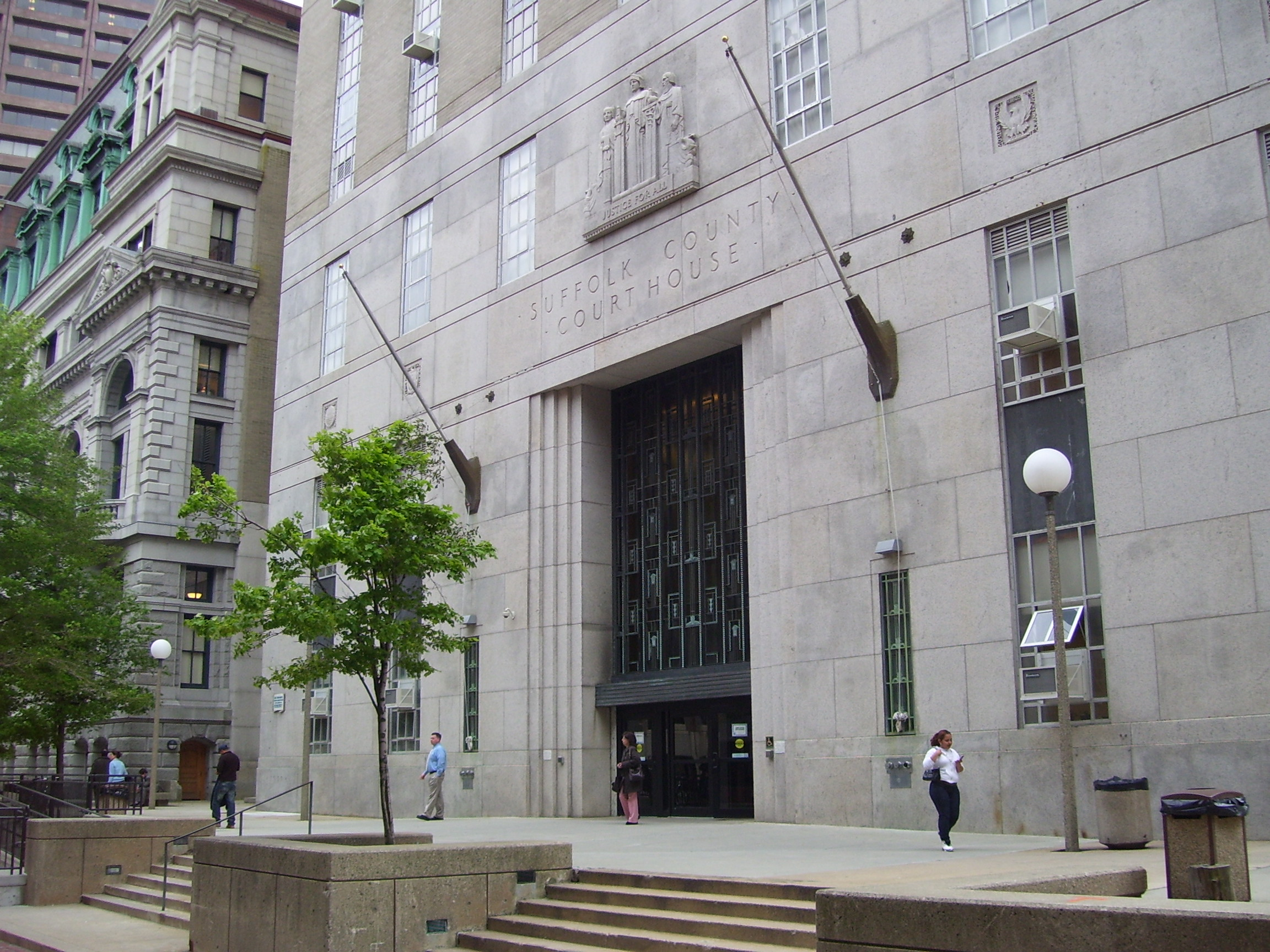
Entrance to the new Suffolk County Courthouse, completed in 1937, adjacent to the John Adams Courthouse, and currently home to the Suffolk County Superior Court

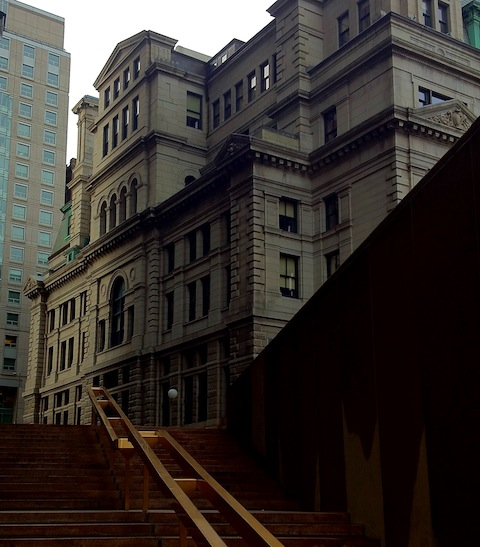
The south side of the Suffolk County Courthouse as viewed from the Tremont Street steps

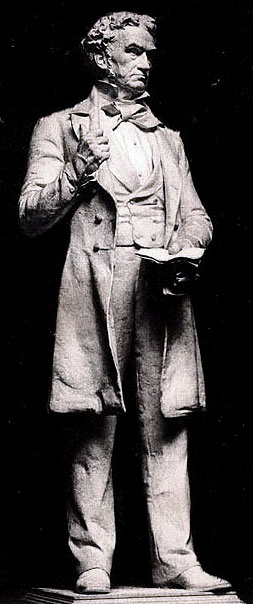
Statue of Rufus Choate, located inside the court house

== See also ==
- National Register of Historic Places listings in northern Boston, Massachusetts
- List of courthouses in Boston
- List of memorials to John Adams
