= Zoltán Lajos Bay =

Hungarian physicist and engineer

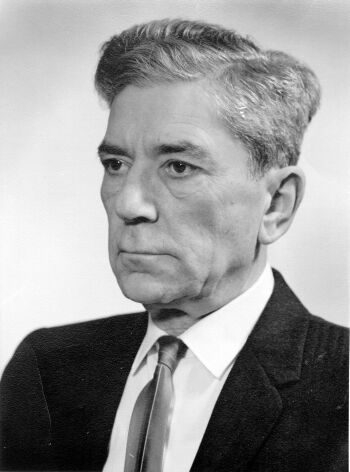
- Born: July 24, 1900; Gyulavári, Hungary
- Died: October 4, 1992 (aged 92); Washington, D.C., U.S.
- Citizenship: Hungarian; American
- Occupations: Physicist, inventor
- Known for: Electron multiplier, radar astronomy, the new definition of a meter (metre)

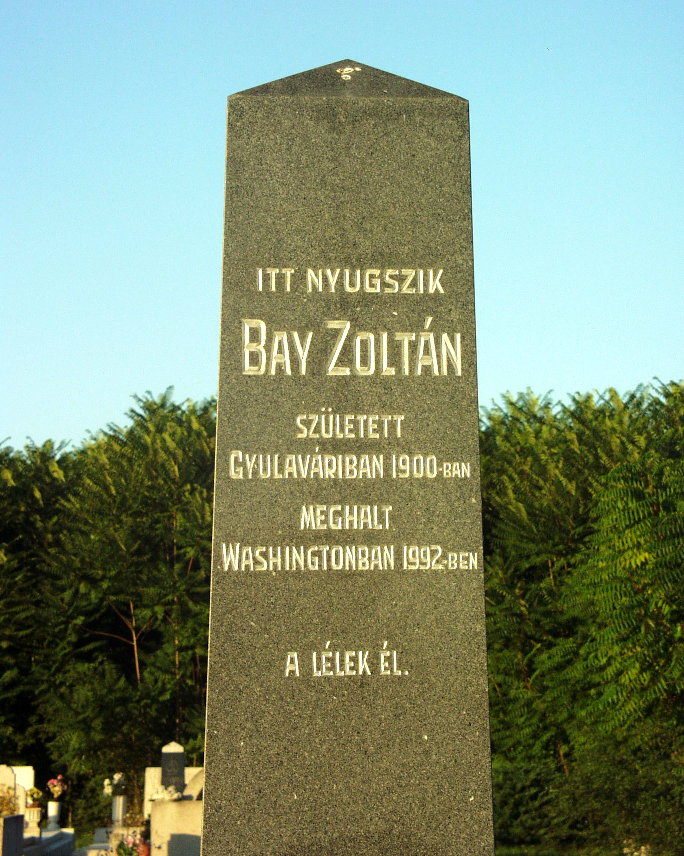
Gravestone of Zoltán Bay (Gyulavári, Hungary)

Zoltán Lajos Bay (July 24, 1900 – October 4, 1992) was a Hungarian physicist, professor, and engineer who developed technologies, including tungsten lamps and microwave devices. He was the leader of the second group to observe radar echoes from the Moon (Moonbounce). From 1930, he worked at the University of Szeged as a professor of theoretical physics.

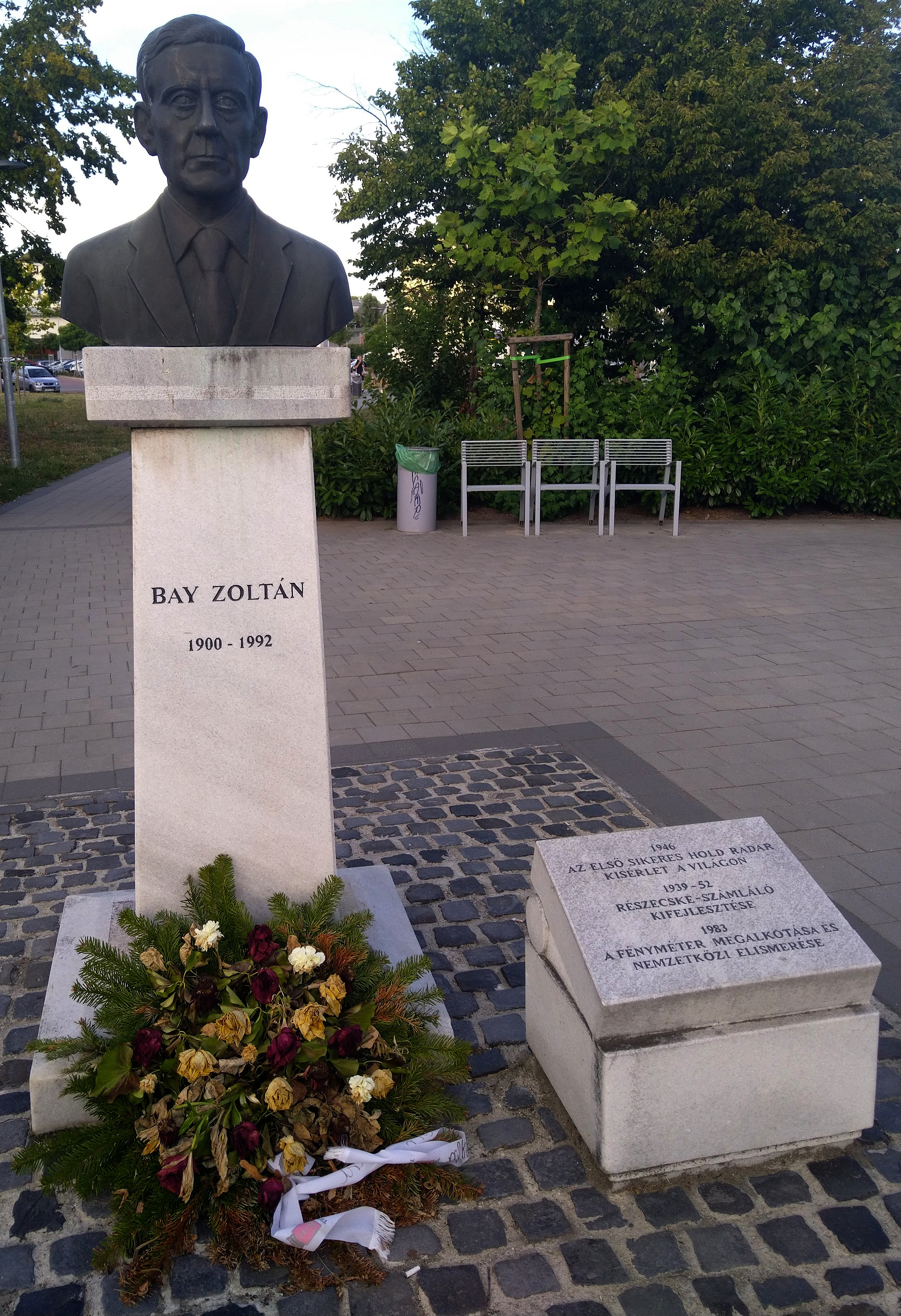
Bust and plaque commemorating Zoltán Bay in Újpest, Hungary. The plaque on the right lists his achievements.

In 1923 at Tungsram Ltd., a research laboratory was established for improving light sources, mainly electric bulbs. The head of that laboratory was Ignác Pfeifer, whose research staff included Bay, along with Tivadar Millner, Imre Bródy, György Szigeti, Ernő Winter, and many others.

György Szigeti worked together with Bay on metal-vapor lamps and fluorescent light sources. They received a U.S. patent on "Electroluminescent light sources" which were made of silicon carbide; these light sources were the ancestors of light-emitting diodes (LEDs).

In 1955, Bay became head of the Department of Nuclear Physics in the National Bureau of Standards (NBS, called today NIST), where he measured the velocity and frequency of light by a previously unknown measurement method. As a result of Bay's research, the 1983 conference of the International Weights and Measures Bureau accepted, as a standard, the definition of a meter (metre) as recommended by Bay.

In 1998, the State of Israel recognized him as among the Righteous Among the Nations and listed his name at Yad Vashem as rescuer number 6497. A relative with the same name invented Bay radial speaker:BayZ

On August 28, 2025, the International Astronomical Union named a small impact crater on the Moon after him. It is located near the lunar south pole and has a diameter of 3.50 km (2.17 mi).
