= List of minor planets: 562001–563000 =

The following is a partial list of minor planets, running from minor-planet number 562001 through 563000, inclusive. The primary data for this and other partial lists is based on JPL's "Small-Body Orbital Elements" and data available from the Minor Planet Center. Critical list information is also provided by the MPC, unless otherwise specified from Lowell Observatory. A detailed description of the table's columns and additional sources are given on the main page including a complete list of every page in this series, and a statistical break-up on the dynamical classification of minor planets.

Also see the summary list of all named bodies in numerical and alphabetical order, and the corresponding naming citations for the number range of this particular list. New namings may only be added to this list after official publication, as the preannouncement of names is condemned by the Working Group for Small Bodies Nomenclature of the International Astronomical Union.

Near-Earth obj.	MBA (inner)	MBA (outer)	Centaur
Mars-crosser	MBA (middle)	Jupiter trojan	Trans-Neptunian obj.
Unclassified

== 562001–562100 ==
Designation			Discovery			Properties		Ref
Permanent	Provisional	Named after	Date	Site	Discoverer(s)	Category	Diam.	Ref
562001	2015 XE_{57}	—	June 26, 2011	Mount Lemmon	Mount Lemmon Survey	·	800 m	MPC · JPL
562002	2015 XO_{58}	—	July 27, 2014	Haleakala	Pan-STARRS 1	·	1.0 km	MPC · JPL
562003	2015 XQ_{58}	—	January 14, 2012	Mayhill-ISON	L. Elenin	EUN	1.4 km	MPC · JPL
562004	2015 XA_{59}	—	February 13, 2008	Kitt Peak	Spacewatch	(5)	940 m	MPC · JPL
562005	2015 XV_{59}	—	June 27, 2014	Haleakala	Pan-STARRS 1	·	2.8 km	MPC · JPL
562006	2015 XD_{61}	—	December 1, 2015	Haleakala	Pan-STARRS 1	V	510 m	MPC · JPL
562007	2015 XM_{61}	—	November 8, 2007	Mount Lemmon	Mount Lemmon Survey	·	1.2 km	MPC · JPL
562008 Samtackeff	2015 XW_{62}	Samtackeff	October 9, 2004	Kitt Peak	Spacewatch	V	520 m	MPC · JPL
562009	2015 XG_{63}	—	December 21, 2011	Črni Vrh	Skvarč, J.	EUN	1.2 km	MPC · JPL
562010	2015 XN_{64}	—	November 28, 2011	Kitt Peak	Spacewatch	·	910 m	MPC · JPL
562011	2015 XZ_{64}	—	May 4, 2009	Kitt Peak	Spacewatch	KON	2.1 km	MPC · JPL
562012	2015 XA_{65}	—	December 1, 2015	Haleakala	Pan-STARRS 1	·	1.1 km	MPC · JPL
562013	2015 XF_{65}	—	April 2, 2013	Mount Lemmon	Mount Lemmon Survey	·	1.6 km	MPC · JPL
562014	2015 XZ_{65}	—	June 27, 2014	Haleakala	Pan-STARRS 1	(5)	1.1 km	MPC · JPL
562015	2015 XC_{66}	—	October 13, 2002	Palomar	NEAT	HNS	1.7 km	MPC · JPL
562016	2015 XG_{66}	—	December 6, 2011	Haleakala	Pan-STARRS 1	·	980 m	MPC · JPL
562017	2015 XG_{69}	—	April 2, 2009	Kitt Peak	Spacewatch	·	970 m	MPC · JPL
562018	2015 XL_{69}	—	October 8, 2015	Haleakala	Pan-STARRS 1	·	700 m	MPC · JPL
562019	2015 XH_{75}	—	May 7, 2014	Haleakala	Pan-STARRS 1	·	1.7 km	MPC · JPL
562020	2015 XT_{75}	—	September 7, 2011	Kitt Peak	Spacewatch	MAS	660 m	MPC · JPL
562021	2015 XX_{75}	—	November 21, 2008	Kitt Peak	Spacewatch	·	570 m	MPC · JPL
562022	2015 XP_{76}	—	March 27, 2008	Mount Lemmon	Mount Lemmon Survey	ADE	1.5 km	MPC · JPL
562023	2015 XT_{77}	—	September 11, 2004	Socorro	LINEAR	PHO	820 m	MPC · JPL
562024	2015 XZ_{77}	—	April 2, 2013	Mount Lemmon	Mount Lemmon Survey	·	1.0 km	MPC · JPL
562025	2015 XK_{79}	—	March 23, 2003	Desert Moon	Stevens, B. L.	AEO	1.0 km	MPC · JPL
562026	2015 XA_{80}	—	November 18, 2015	Haleakala	Pan-STARRS 1	·	910 m	MPC · JPL
562027	2015 XM_{80}	—	December 30, 2011	Catalina	CSS	·	3.1 km	MPC · JPL
562028	2015 XR_{80}	—	October 30, 2006	Catalina	CSS	·	1.5 km	MPC · JPL
562029	2015 XT_{81}	—	September 2, 2010	Mount Lemmon	Mount Lemmon Survey	·	1.1 km	MPC · JPL
562030	2015 XZ_{81}	—	April 12, 2013	Haleakala	Pan-STARRS 1	HNS	830 m	MPC · JPL
562031	2015 XG_{82}	—	September 14, 2007	Mount Lemmon	Mount Lemmon Survey	PHO	750 m	MPC · JPL
562032	2015 XY_{82}	—	April 7, 2008	Catalina	CSS	JUN	1.0 km	MPC · JPL
562033	2015 XJ_{83}	—	October 19, 2015	Haleakala	Pan-STARRS 1	EUN	1.1 km	MPC · JPL
562034	2015 XV_{83}	—	June 4, 2013	Mount Lemmon	Mount Lemmon Survey	HNS	1.0 km	MPC · JPL
562035	2015 XL_{85}	—	June 1, 2009	Mount Lemmon	Mount Lemmon Survey	·	1.1 km	MPC · JPL
562036	2015 XH_{86}	—	February 8, 2008	Kitt Peak	Spacewatch	·	1.3 km	MPC · JPL
562037	2015 XR_{86}	—	November 17, 2006	Mount Lemmon	Mount Lemmon Survey	·	1.5 km	MPC · JPL
562038	2015 XX_{86}	—	October 2, 2010	Charleston	R. Holmes	·	2.0 km	MPC · JPL
562039	2015 XF_{88}	—	October 9, 2005	Kitt Peak	Spacewatch	·	2.0 km	MPC · JPL
562040	2015 XA_{91}	—	September 28, 2011	Mount Lemmon	Mount Lemmon Survey	V	540 m	MPC · JPL
562041	2015 XR_{93}	—	October 9, 2015	Haleakala	Pan-STARRS 1	·	770 m	MPC · JPL
562042	2015 XB_{95}	—	November 24, 2003	Kitt Peak	Spacewatch	·	810 m	MPC · JPL
562043	2015 XY_{99}	—	October 9, 2015	Haleakala	Pan-STARRS 1	·	950 m	MPC · JPL
562044	2015 XK_{103}	—	May 5, 2010	Mount Lemmon	Mount Lemmon Survey	·	950 m	MPC · JPL
562045	2015 XN_{109}	—	February 21, 2006	Mount Lemmon	Mount Lemmon Survey	·	1.0 km	MPC · JPL
562046	2015 XA_{111}	—	July 27, 2011	Haleakala	Pan-STARRS 1	·	750 m	MPC · JPL
562047	2015 XH_{111}	—	November 3, 2015	Mount Lemmon	Mount Lemmon Survey	·	1.7 km	MPC · JPL
562048	2015 XL_{111}	—	November 18, 2015	Kitt Peak	Spacewatch	KON	2.1 km	MPC · JPL
562049	2015 XR_{111}	—	September 23, 2011	Haleakala	Pan-STARRS 1	V	600 m	MPC · JPL
562050	2015 XX_{112}	—	April 9, 2000	Anderson Mesa	LONEOS	·	1.6 km	MPC · JPL
562051	2015 XM_{120}	—	December 4, 2015	Haleakala	Pan-STARRS 1	EUN	820 m	MPC · JPL
562052	2015 XN_{121}	—	June 18, 2013	Haleakala	Pan-STARRS 1	·	1.3 km	MPC · JPL
562053	2015 XF_{122}	—	March 28, 2008	Mount Lemmon	Mount Lemmon Survey	JUN	900 m	MPC · JPL
562054	2015 XQ_{124}	—	November 16, 2010	Catalina	CSS	BRA	1.7 km	MPC · JPL
562055	2015 XU_{124}	—	January 6, 2012	Kitt Peak	Spacewatch	EUN	1.0 km	MPC · JPL
562056	2015 XV_{124}	—	January 11, 2008	Kitt Peak	Spacewatch	·	1.0 km	MPC · JPL
562057	2015 XY_{124}	—	July 3, 2011	Mount Lemmon	Mount Lemmon Survey	·	950 m	MPC · JPL
562058	2015 XO_{125}	—	July 4, 2014	Haleakala	Pan-STARRS 1	·	1.2 km	MPC · JPL
562059	2015 XL_{127}	—	December 9, 2004	Kitt Peak	Spacewatch	·	1.0 km	MPC · JPL
562060	2015 XS_{127}	—	October 30, 2005	Kitt Peak	Spacewatch	·	1.7 km	MPC · JPL
562061	2015 XO_{131}	—	January 11, 2008	Kitt Peak	Spacewatch	·	1.0 km	MPC · JPL
562062	2015 XY_{131}	—	January 16, 2008	Kitt Peak	Spacewatch	·	1.1 km	MPC · JPL
562063	2015 XG_{133}	—	March 27, 2009	Kitt Peak	Spacewatch	·	1.1 km	MPC · JPL
562064	2015 XQ_{133}	—	May 31, 2014	Haleakala	Pan-STARRS 1	MAR	830 m	MPC · JPL
562065	2015 XV_{133}	—	August 3, 2014	Haleakala	Pan-STARRS 1	·	850 m	MPC · JPL
562066	2015 XX_{138}	—	December 22, 2008	Kitt Peak	Spacewatch	MAS	600 m	MPC · JPL
562067	2015 XK_{139}	—	September 29, 2008	Mount Lemmon	Mount Lemmon Survey	·	720 m	MPC · JPL
562068	2015 XO_{140}	—	April 16, 2013	Haleakala	Pan-STARRS 1	·	1.2 km	MPC · JPL
562069	2015 XE_{141}	—	December 4, 2015	Mount Lemmon	Mount Lemmon Survey	VER	2.2 km	MPC · JPL
562070	2015 XC_{142}	—	December 4, 2007	Kitt Peak	Spacewatch	·	750 m	MPC · JPL
562071	2015 XT_{142}	—	August 24, 2011	La Sagra	OAM	NYS	810 m	MPC · JPL
562072	2015 XL_{143}	—	September 4, 2010	Mount Lemmon	Mount Lemmon Survey	EUN	1.3 km	MPC · JPL
562073	2015 XC_{145}	—	September 23, 2015	Haleakala	Pan-STARRS 1	·	1.6 km	MPC · JPL
562074	2015 XT_{147}	—	January 30, 2009	Mount Lemmon	Mount Lemmon Survey	MAS	620 m	MPC · JPL
562075	2015 XX_{148}	—	November 17, 2011	Kitt Peak	Spacewatch	·	850 m	MPC · JPL
562076	2015 XZ_{148}	—	December 4, 2015	Mount Lemmon	Mount Lemmon Survey	·	840 m	MPC · JPL
562077	2015 XZ_{149}	—	February 13, 2004	Kitt Peak	Spacewatch	MAR	1.0 km	MPC · JPL
562078	2015 XA_{150}	—	September 4, 2014	Haleakala	Pan-STARRS 1	·	1.7 km	MPC · JPL
562079	2015 XA_{152}	—	July 21, 2006	Mount Lemmon	Mount Lemmon Survey	·	2.4 km	MPC · JPL
562080	2015 XF_{152}	—	February 12, 2008	Mount Lemmon	Mount Lemmon Survey	·	1.5 km	MPC · JPL
562081	2015 XO_{152}	—	September 23, 2015	Haleakala	Pan-STARRS 1	HNS	970 m	MPC · JPL
562082	2015 XQ_{152}	—	December 16, 2011	Mount Lemmon	Mount Lemmon Survey	·	2.2 km	MPC · JPL
562083	2015 XQ_{154}	—	January 14, 2008	Kitt Peak	Spacewatch	JUN	760 m	MPC · JPL
562084	2015 XX_{157}	—	December 5, 2015	Haleakala	Pan-STARRS 1	BRA	1.4 km	MPC · JPL
562085	2015 XO_{163}	—	October 23, 2011	Haleakala	Pan-STARRS 1	EUN	970 m	MPC · JPL
562086	2015 XH_{164}	—	January 27, 2004	Kitt Peak	Spacewatch	·	1.1 km	MPC · JPL
562087	2015 XV_{164}	—	March 16, 2013	Kitt Peak	Spacewatch	·	1.4 km	MPC · JPL
562088	2015 XC_{167}	—	January 30, 2004	Kitt Peak	Spacewatch	·	820 m	MPC · JPL
562089	2015 XX_{170}	—	September 14, 2010	Mount Lemmon	Mount Lemmon Survey	·	1.6 km	MPC · JPL
562090	2015 XB_{171}	—	November 12, 2015	Catalina	CSS	EUN	1.5 km	MPC · JPL
562091	2015 XF_{171}	—	August 3, 2015	Haleakala	Pan-STARRS 1	·	1.1 km	MPC · JPL
562092	2015 XE_{172}	—	January 30, 2012	Mount Lemmon	Mount Lemmon Survey	·	2.2 km	MPC · JPL
562093	2015 XA_{175}	—	April 15, 2013	Haleakala	Pan-STARRS 1	KON	2.0 km	MPC · JPL
562094	2015 XH_{175}	—	December 27, 2003	Kitt Peak	Spacewatch	·	750 m	MPC · JPL
562095	2015 XX_{176}	—	January 13, 2008	Mount Lemmon	Mount Lemmon Survey	(5)	1.1 km	MPC · JPL
562096	2015 XL_{180}	—	December 30, 2007	Kitt Peak	Spacewatch	·	1.0 km	MPC · JPL
562097	2015 XH_{181}	—	April 27, 2009	Mount Lemmon	Mount Lemmon Survey	·	810 m	MPC · JPL
562098	2015 XN_{181}	—	March 19, 2013	Haleakala	Pan-STARRS 1	·	850 m	MPC · JPL
562099	2015 XO_{182}	—	July 8, 2014	Haleakala	Pan-STARRS 1	·	2.0 km	MPC · JPL
562100	2015 XU_{187}	—	September 15, 2007	Kitt Peak	Spacewatch	·	1.1 km	MPC · JPL

== 562101–562200 ==
back to top

Designation			Discovery			Properties		Ref
Permanent	Provisional	Named after	Date	Site	Discoverer(s)	Category	Diam.	Ref
562101	2015 XC_{188}	—	September 23, 2009	Kitt Peak	Spacewatch	·	1.9 km	MPC · JPL
562102	2015 XO_{188}	—	September 26, 1992	Kitt Peak	Spacewatch	·	1.1 km	MPC · JPL
562103	2015 XB_{190}	—	May 19, 2014	Haleakala	Pan-STARRS 1	PHO	790 m	MPC · JPL
562104	2015 XC_{190}	—	November 15, 2007	Catalina	CSS	·	1.3 km	MPC · JPL
562105	2015 XK_{192}	—	May 28, 2014	Haleakala	Pan-STARRS 1	·	870 m	MPC · JPL
562106	2015 XG_{194}	—	March 13, 2013	Palomar	Palomar Transient Factory	·	1.4 km	MPC · JPL
562107	2015 XB_{195}	—	January 15, 2008	Mount Lemmon	Mount Lemmon Survey	(5)	1.2 km	MPC · JPL
562108	2015 XU_{196}	—	December 29, 2011	Mount Lemmon	Mount Lemmon Survey	·	1.4 km	MPC · JPL
562109	2015 XY_{196}	—	January 11, 2008	Kitt Peak	Spacewatch	·	940 m	MPC · JPL
562110	2015 XO_{197}	—	November 23, 2002	Palomar	NEAT	(1547)	1.4 km	MPC · JPL
562111	2015 XJ_{198}	—	April 16, 2005	Kitt Peak	Spacewatch	·	910 m	MPC · JPL
562112	2015 XY_{199}	—	May 26, 2007	Siding Spring	SSS	·	1 km	MPC · JPL
562113	2015 XL_{200}	—	November 24, 2003	Kitt Peak	Spacewatch	·	1.1 km	MPC · JPL
562114	2015 XP_{200}	—	November 25, 2011	Haleakala	Pan-STARRS 1	KRM	2.5 km	MPC · JPL
562115	2015 XT_{200}	—	August 26, 2011	Kitt Peak	Spacewatch	MAS	650 m	MPC · JPL
562116	2015 XR_{201}	—	December 3, 2008	Mount Lemmon	Mount Lemmon Survey	·	850 m	MPC · JPL
562117	2015 XW_{201}	—	January 2, 2009	Kitt Peak	Spacewatch	MAS	600 m	MPC · JPL
562118	2015 XW_{203}	—	February 12, 2012	Haleakala	Pan-STARRS 1	·	1.6 km	MPC · JPL
562119	2015 XE_{204}	—	August 27, 2006	Kitt Peak	Spacewatch	·	1.1 km	MPC · JPL
562120	2015 XH_{205}	—	February 17, 2013	Kitt Peak	Spacewatch	·	1.2 km	MPC · JPL
562121	2015 XQ_{205}	—	January 20, 2009	Kitt Peak	Spacewatch	MAS	740 m	MPC · JPL
562122	2015 XE_{206}	—	January 1, 2008	Kitt Peak	Spacewatch	·	780 m	MPC · JPL
562123	2015 XH_{207}	—	November 22, 2015	Mount Lemmon	Mount Lemmon Survey	·	840 m	MPC · JPL
562124	2015 XV_{207}	—	November 25, 2011	Haleakala	Pan-STARRS 1	(5)	920 m	MPC · JPL
562125	2015 XH_{208}	—	November 11, 2007	Mount Lemmon	Mount Lemmon Survey	RAF	910 m	MPC · JPL
562126	2015 XF_{209}	—	June 1, 2013	Haleakala	Pan-STARRS 1	·	2.0 km	MPC · JPL
562127	2015 XN_{209}	—	November 22, 2015	Mount Lemmon	Mount Lemmon Survey	·	760 m	MPC · JPL
562128	2015 XW_{209}	—	December 5, 2007	Kitt Peak	Spacewatch	(5)	780 m	MPC · JPL
562129	2015 XD_{211}	—	December 4, 2007	Mount Lemmon	Mount Lemmon Survey	·	960 m	MPC · JPL
562130	2015 XM_{211}	—	November 3, 2015	Mount Lemmon	Mount Lemmon Survey	·	1.5 km	MPC · JPL
562131	2015 XJ_{213}	—	September 20, 2011	Kitt Peak	Spacewatch	·	870 m	MPC · JPL
562132	2015 XA_{214}	—	September 8, 2011	Kitt Peak	Spacewatch	·	820 m	MPC · JPL
562133	2015 XN_{217}	—	December 1, 2008	Kitt Peak	Spacewatch	·	890 m	MPC · JPL
562134	2015 XZ_{217}	—	May 4, 2005	Mauna Kea	Veillet, C.	·	870 m	MPC · JPL
562135	2015 XD_{218}	—	February 7, 2008	Kitt Peak	Spacewatch	·	1.3 km	MPC · JPL
562136	2015 XJ_{218}	—	July 24, 2015	Haleakala	Pan-STARRS 1	·	1.4 km	MPC · JPL
562137	2015 XE_{220}	—	March 5, 2013	Haleakala	Pan-STARRS 1	·	1.2 km	MPC · JPL
562138	2015 XK_{220}	—	March 24, 2012	Mount Lemmon	Mount Lemmon Survey	EOS	1.5 km	MPC · JPL
562139	2015 XP_{221}	—	September 23, 2011	Haleakala	Pan-STARRS 1	·	920 m	MPC · JPL
562140	2015 XC_{225}	—	August 28, 2014	Haleakala	Pan-STARRS 1	·	1.5 km	MPC · JPL
562141	2015 XG_{227}	—	September 20, 2011	Mount Lemmon	Mount Lemmon Survey	·	940 m	MPC · JPL
562142	2015 XT_{228}	—	October 26, 2011	Haleakala	Pan-STARRS 1	·	1.0 km	MPC · JPL
562143	2015 XN_{230}	—	December 30, 2011	Mount Lemmon	Mount Lemmon Survey	·	1.0 km	MPC · JPL
562144	2015 XS_{231}	—	September 23, 2015	Haleakala	Pan-STARRS 1	·	1.3 km	MPC · JPL
562145	2015 XY_{234}	—	December 6, 2015	Haleakala	Pan-STARRS 1	·	780 m	MPC · JPL
562146	2015 XS_{235}	—	December 6, 2015	Haleakala	Pan-STARRS 1	V	560 m	MPC · JPL
562147	2015 XR_{239}	—	November 22, 2015	Mount Lemmon	Mount Lemmon Survey	·	910 m	MPC · JPL
562148	2015 XE_{240}	—	January 18, 2008	Kitt Peak	Spacewatch	·	1.1 km	MPC · JPL
562149	2015 XM_{243}	—	March 30, 2008	Catalina	CSS	·	1.7 km	MPC · JPL
562150	2015 XT_{243}	—	September 25, 2011	Haleakala	Pan-STARRS 1	·	1.0 km	MPC · JPL
562151	2015 XO_{244}	—	February 26, 2009	Kitt Peak	Spacewatch	·	970 m	MPC · JPL
562152	2015 XU_{244}	—	September 14, 2010	Mount Lemmon	Mount Lemmon Survey	EUN	950 m	MPC · JPL
562153	2015 XX_{244}	—	September 17, 2010	Kitt Peak	Spacewatch	EUN	1.1 km	MPC · JPL
562154	2015 XC_{245}	—	November 12, 2010	Kitt Peak	Spacewatch	·	2.2 km	MPC · JPL
562155	2015 XG_{245}	—	May 10, 2007	Mount Lemmon	Mount Lemmon Survey	·	2.0 km	MPC · JPL
562156	2015 XH_{245}	—	February 28, 2012	Haleakala	Pan-STARRS 1	·	1.3 km	MPC · JPL
562157	2015 XK_{245}	—	December 6, 2015	Haleakala	Pan-STARRS 1	·	1.4 km	MPC · JPL
562158	2015 XN_{245}	—	August 5, 2014	Haleakala	Pan-STARRS 1	·	1.9 km	MPC · JPL
562159	2015 XV_{245}	—	October 17, 2006	Catalina	CSS	·	1.3 km	MPC · JPL
562160	2015 XJ_{251}	—	October 12, 2015	ESA OGS	ESA OGS	·	950 m	MPC · JPL
562161	2015 XP_{255}	—	January 18, 2008	Kitt Peak	Spacewatch	HNS	900 m	MPC · JPL
562162	2015 XP_{257}	—	December 7, 2015	Haleakala	Pan-STARRS 1	·	1.2 km	MPC · JPL
562163	2015 XT_{257}	—	September 28, 2003	Kitt Peak	Spacewatch	·	1.3 km	MPC · JPL
562164	2015 XL_{258}	—	April 14, 2010	Mount Lemmon	Mount Lemmon Survey	NYS	1.0 km	MPC · JPL
562165	2015 XD_{259}	—	November 11, 2007	Mount Lemmon	Mount Lemmon Survey	(5)	1.3 km	MPC · JPL
562166	2015 XK_{259}	—	December 26, 2011	Kitt Peak	Spacewatch	·	1.1 km	MPC · JPL
562167	2015 XQ_{259}	—	September 26, 2006	Catalina	CSS	·	1.7 km	MPC · JPL
562168	2015 XQ_{260}	—	October 5, 2013	Mount Lemmon	Mount Lemmon Survey	L5	6.8 km	MPC · JPL
562169	2015 XV_{260}	—	December 8, 2015	Haleakala	Pan-STARRS 1	H	420 m	MPC · JPL
562170	2015 XJ_{263}	—	November 19, 2008	Mount Lemmon	Mount Lemmon Survey	·	600 m	MPC · JPL
562171	2015 XX_{263}	—	May 21, 2014	Haleakala	Pan-STARRS 1	·	950 m	MPC · JPL
562172	2015 XN_{264}	—	November 22, 2015	Mount Lemmon	Mount Lemmon Survey	·	990 m	MPC · JPL
562173	2015 XJ_{268}	—	April 6, 2013	Haleakala	Pan-STARRS 1	·	1.3 km	MPC · JPL
562174	2015 XZ_{271}	—	November 8, 2007	Kitt Peak	Spacewatch	·	1.4 km	MPC · JPL
562175	2015 XK_{272}	—	April 5, 2005	Mount Lemmon	Mount Lemmon Survey	·	1.2 km	MPC · JPL
562176	2015 XF_{276}	—	November 19, 2008	Mount Lemmon	Mount Lemmon Survey	·	970 m	MPC · JPL
562177	2015 XG_{276}	—	March 4, 2008	Catalina	CSS	·	1.2 km	MPC · JPL
562178	2015 XN_{277}	—	December 30, 2008	Mount Lemmon	Mount Lemmon Survey	·	840 m	MPC · JPL
562179	2015 XZ_{278}	—	January 12, 2008	Kitt Peak	Spacewatch	·	1.1 km	MPC · JPL
562180	2015 XJ_{279}	—	October 23, 2004	Kitt Peak	Spacewatch	·	960 m	MPC · JPL
562181	2015 XP_{282}	—	September 25, 2011	Haleakala	Pan-STARRS 1	·	1.1 km	MPC · JPL
562182	2015 XY_{283}	—	December 26, 1998	Kitt Peak	Spacewatch	·	1.5 km	MPC · JPL
562183	2015 XB_{284}	—	September 25, 2011	Haleakala	Pan-STARRS 1	·	1.1 km	MPC · JPL
562184	2015 XO_{284}	—	April 30, 2009	Mount Lemmon	Mount Lemmon Survey	HNS	1.3 km	MPC · JPL
562185	2015 XV_{289}	—	October 11, 2007	Catalina	CSS	NYS	1.0 km	MPC · JPL
562186	2015 XW_{291}	—	December 21, 2008	Mount Lemmon	Mount Lemmon Survey	·	850 m	MPC · JPL
562187	2015 XE_{294}	—	May 20, 2014	Haleakala	Pan-STARRS 1	·	830 m	MPC · JPL
562188	2015 XU_{295}	—	September 10, 2007	Mount Lemmon	Mount Lemmon Survey	MAS	650 m	MPC · JPL
562189	2015 XR_{297}	—	November 22, 2015	Mount Lemmon	Mount Lemmon Survey	·	830 m	MPC · JPL
562190	2015 XJ_{298}	—	January 31, 2004	Campo Imperatore	CINEOS	·	1.2 km	MPC · JPL
562191	2015 XU_{298}	—	May 21, 2014	Haleakala	Pan-STARRS 1	·	860 m	MPC · JPL
562192	2015 XF_{300}	—	March 25, 2006	Mount Lemmon	Mount Lemmon Survey	MAS	750 m	MPC · JPL
562193	2015 XR_{300}	—	December 31, 2007	Kitt Peak	Spacewatch	·	930 m	MPC · JPL
562194	2015 XD_{308}	—	December 7, 2015	Haleakala	Pan-STARRS 1	MAR	930 m	MPC · JPL
562195	2015 XR_{308}	—	October 16, 2015	Mount Lemmon	Mount Lemmon Survey	·	830 m	MPC · JPL
562196	2015 XH_{309}	—	November 7, 2008	Mount Lemmon	Mount Lemmon Survey	·	1.5 km	MPC · JPL
562197	2015 XS_{309}	—	November 7, 2015	Mount Lemmon	Mount Lemmon Survey	EUN	1.1 km	MPC · JPL
562198	2015 XT_{309}	—	September 26, 2011	Haleakala	Pan-STARRS 1	·	1.1 km	MPC · JPL
562199	2015 XJ_{310}	—	November 11, 2007	Mount Lemmon	Mount Lemmon Survey	·	1.2 km	MPC · JPL
562200	2015 XN_{311}	—	November 12, 2001	Apache Point	SDSS Collaboration	·	650 m	MPC · JPL

== 562201–562300 ==
back to top

Designation			Discovery			Properties		Ref
Permanent	Provisional	Named after	Date	Site	Discoverer(s)	Category	Diam.	Ref
562201	2015 XF_{312}	—	October 9, 2011	Ka-Dar	Gerke, V.	(5)	1.4 km	MPC · JPL
562202	2015 XR_{312}	—	May 31, 2014	Haleakala	Pan-STARRS 1	EUN	1.2 km	MPC · JPL
562203	2015 XV_{312}	—	November 27, 2006	Mount Lemmon	Mount Lemmon Survey	·	1.7 km	MPC · JPL
562204	2015 XH_{313}	—	November 26, 2005	Mount Lemmon	Mount Lemmon Survey	·	540 m	MPC · JPL
562205	2015 XQ_{313}	—	March 5, 2002	Apache Point	SDSS Collaboration	·	1.0 km	MPC · JPL
562206	2015 XM_{315}	—	September 27, 2002	Palomar	NEAT	EUN	1.4 km	MPC · JPL
562207	2015 XB_{317}	—	April 2, 2006	Kitt Peak	Spacewatch	MAS	560 m	MPC · JPL
562208	2015 XG_{317}	—	July 8, 2003	Palomar	NEAT	·	1.2 km	MPC · JPL
562209	2015 XO_{322}	—	March 13, 2008	Kitt Peak	Spacewatch	·	1.1 km	MPC · JPL
562210	2015 XB_{323}	—	December 29, 2003	Kitt Peak	Spacewatch	·	1.3 km	MPC · JPL
562211	2015 XH_{324}	—	December 8, 2015	Mount Lemmon	Mount Lemmon Survey	EUN	920 m	MPC · JPL
562212	2015 XE_{325}	—	October 10, 2007	Kitt Peak	Spacewatch	·	1.0 km	MPC · JPL
562213	2015 XP_{325}	—	September 29, 2011	Kitt Peak	Spacewatch	NYS	1.1 km	MPC · JPL
562214	2015 XG_{326}	—	March 8, 2005	Mount Lemmon	Mount Lemmon Survey	·	1.2 km	MPC · JPL
562215	2015 XL_{326}	—	February 10, 2007	Mount Lemmon	Mount Lemmon Survey	·	1.5 km	MPC · JPL
562216	2015 XQ_{326}	—	December 30, 2007	Kitt Peak	Spacewatch	·	1.1 km	MPC · JPL
562217	2015 XG_{327}	—	September 10, 2007	Kitt Peak	Spacewatch	NYS	1 km	MPC · JPL
562218	2015 XC_{329}	—	April 16, 2013	Haleakala	Pan-STARRS 1	·	1.1 km	MPC · JPL
562219	2015 XV_{329}	—	December 8, 2015	Haleakala	Pan-STARRS 1	·	730 m	MPC · JPL
562220	2015 XL_{332}	—	September 17, 2003	Kitt Peak	Spacewatch	·	1.1 km	MPC · JPL
562221	2015 XQ_{332}	—	October 17, 2011	Kitt Peak	Spacewatch	·	930 m	MPC · JPL
562222	2015 XT_{332}	—	October 2, 2006	Mount Lemmon	Mount Lemmon Survey	·	990 m	MPC · JPL
562223	2015 XA_{333}	—	June 12, 2004	Palomar	NEAT	·	2.6 km	MPC · JPL
562224	2015 XD_{333}	—	December 29, 2011	Mount Lemmon	Mount Lemmon Survey	HNS	900 m	MPC · JPL
562225	2015 XK_{333}	—	November 29, 2003	Kitt Peak	Spacewatch	·	920 m	MPC · JPL
562226	2015 XS_{334}	—	January 26, 2012	Mount Lemmon	Mount Lemmon Survey	·	860 m	MPC · JPL
562227	2015 XD_{336}	—	June 21, 2010	Mount Lemmon	Mount Lemmon Survey	·	1.2 km	MPC · JPL
562228	2015 XS_{336}	—	January 11, 2008	Kitt Peak	Spacewatch	·	950 m	MPC · JPL
562229	2015 XZ_{341}	—	March 31, 2004	Kitt Peak	Spacewatch	·	1.3 km	MPC · JPL
562230	2015 XE_{345}	—	October 18, 2011	Kitt Peak	Spacewatch	NYS	1.2 km	MPC · JPL
562231	2015 XJ_{346}	—	December 4, 2007	Kitt Peak	Spacewatch	·	1.0 km	MPC · JPL
562232	2015 XX_{346}	—	December 25, 2011	Mount Lemmon	Mount Lemmon Survey	·	950 m	MPC · JPL
562233	2015 XQ_{347}	—	September 12, 2007	Kitt Peak	Spacewatch	·	930 m	MPC · JPL
562234	2015 XC_{348}	—	July 8, 2014	Haleakala	Pan-STARRS 1	·	1.2 km	MPC · JPL
562235	2015 XV_{348}	—	September 29, 2011	Kitt Peak	Spacewatch	NYS	960 m	MPC · JPL
562236	2015 XA_{349}	—	December 3, 2007	Kitt Peak	Spacewatch	·	870 m	MPC · JPL
562237 Chentsov	2015 XV_{349}	Chentsov	November 22, 2011	Zelenchukskaya Stn	T. V. Krjačko, Satovski, B.	·	1.2 km	MPC · JPL
562238	2015 XJ_{350}	—	April 11, 2005	Mount Lemmon	Mount Lemmon Survey	·	1.1 km	MPC · JPL
562239	2015 XX_{350}	—	February 11, 2000	La Silla	Cavadore, C., Colas, F.	(5)	880 m	MPC · JPL
562240	2015 XG_{353}	—	September 17, 2006	Kitt Peak	Spacewatch	·	930 m	MPC · JPL
562241	2015 XK_{353}	—	December 20, 2011	ESA OGS	ESA OGS	BRG	1.5 km	MPC · JPL
562242	2015 XR_{353}	—	March 16, 2013	Kitt Peak	Spacewatch	·	880 m	MPC · JPL
562243	2015 XC_{355}	—	November 25, 2011	Haleakala	Pan-STARRS 1	·	1.5 km	MPC · JPL
562244	2015 XG_{355}	—	December 22, 2008	Mount Lemmon	Mount Lemmon Survey	·	950 m	MPC · JPL
562245	2015 XP_{355}	—	October 24, 2011	Catalina	CSS	·	1.3 km	MPC · JPL
562246	2015 XE_{356}	—	March 16, 2012	Haleakala	Pan-STARRS 1	·	1.8 km	MPC · JPL
562247	2015 XH_{356}	—	January 13, 1996	Kitt Peak	Spacewatch	·	1.4 km	MPC · JPL
562248	2015 XP_{357}	—	November 17, 2015	Haleakala	Pan-STARRS 1	MAR	730 m	MPC · JPL
562249	2015 XR_{357}	—	December 21, 2003	Kitt Peak	Spacewatch	·	810 m	MPC · JPL
562250	2015 XH_{358}	—	October 8, 2015	Haleakala	Pan-STARRS 1	·	860 m	MPC · JPL
562251	2015 XA_{359}	—	April 12, 2008	Mount Lemmon	Mount Lemmon Survey	·	1.2 km	MPC · JPL
562252	2015 XV_{359}	—	February 24, 2012	Mount Lemmon	Mount Lemmon Survey	·	1.3 km	MPC · JPL
562253	2015 XF_{360}	—	January 17, 2013	Haleakala	Pan-STARRS 1	·	890 m	MPC · JPL
562254	2015 XG_{360}	—	April 13, 1996	Kitt Peak	Spacewatch	·	1.6 km	MPC · JPL
562255	2015 XL_{362}	—	December 8, 2015	Mount Lemmon	Mount Lemmon Survey	EUN	1.1 km	MPC · JPL
562256	2015 XR_{362}	—	June 28, 2014	Haleakala	Pan-STARRS 1	·	1.0 km	MPC · JPL
562257	2015 XN_{364}	—	January 21, 2012	Mayhill-ISON	L. Elenin	ADE	1.7 km	MPC · JPL
562258	2015 XE_{365}	—	January 25, 2012	Haleakala	Pan-STARRS 1	·	1.7 km	MPC · JPL
562259	2015 XJ_{365}	—	January 20, 2008	Kitt Peak	Spacewatch	·	1.1 km	MPC · JPL
562260	2015 XK_{365}	—	November 17, 2007	Mount Lemmon	Mount Lemmon Survey	·	730 m	MPC · JPL
562261	2015 XN_{365}	—	March 29, 2008	Kitt Peak	Spacewatch	GEF	1.2 km	MPC · JPL
562262	2015 XU_{366}	—	December 5, 2007	Kitt Peak	Spacewatch	·	1.4 km	MPC · JPL
562263	2015 XM_{367}	—	June 30, 2014	Haleakala	Pan-STARRS 1	·	2.0 km	MPC · JPL
562264	2015 XP_{368}	—	August 28, 2014	Haleakala	Pan-STARRS 1	·	1.1 km	MPC · JPL
562265	2015 XS_{369}	—	August 24, 2011	La Sagra	OAM	·	920 m	MPC · JPL
562266	2015 XD_{370}	—	December 8, 2015	Mount Lemmon	Mount Lemmon Survey	EUN	1.3 km	MPC · JPL
562267	2015 XG_{370}	—	January 21, 2012	Kitt Peak	Spacewatch	·	1.3 km	MPC · JPL
562268	2015 XW_{370}	—	December 12, 2015	Haleakala	Pan-STARRS 1	·	1.2 km	MPC · JPL
562269	2015 XZ_{372}	—	August 23, 2014	Haleakala	Pan-STARRS 1	·	1.8 km	MPC · JPL
562270	2015 XS_{374}	—	November 6, 2008	Mount Lemmon	Mount Lemmon Survey	·	740 m	MPC · JPL
562271	2015 XQ_{376}	—	December 18, 2007	Kitt Peak	Spacewatch	·	1.0 km	MPC · JPL
562272	2015 XU_{377}	—	January 21, 2012	Mayhill-ISON	L. Elenin	·	1.5 km	MPC · JPL
562273	2015 XC_{378}	—	September 17, 2011	Haleakala	Pan-STARRS 1	·	1.6 km	MPC · JPL
562274	2015 XW_{379}	—	December 11, 2015	Calar Alto	S. Hellmich, S. Mottola	centaur	245 km	MPC · JPL
562275	2015 XH_{380}	—	September 24, 2011	Haleakala	Pan-STARRS 1	·	1.0 km	MPC · JPL
562276	2015 XK_{380}	—	December 8, 2010	Kitt Peak	Spacewatch	BRA	1.3 km	MPC · JPL
562277	2015 XU_{380}	—	November 28, 2011	Haleakala	Pan-STARRS 1	·	1.0 km	MPC · JPL
562278	2015 XD_{381}	—	March 10, 2005	Mount Lemmon	Mount Lemmon Survey	·	1.1 km	MPC · JPL
562279	2015 XF_{381}	—	March 2, 2009	Mount Lemmon	Mount Lemmon Survey	MAR	1.1 km	MPC · JPL
562280	2015 XK_{383}	—	July 19, 2009	La Sagra	OAM	·	1.9 km	MPC · JPL
562281	2015 XM_{383}	—	January 22, 1993	Kitt Peak	Spacewatch	·	1.6 km	MPC · JPL
562282	2015 XR_{383}	—	March 16, 2004	Catalina	CSS	·	1.3 km	MPC · JPL
562283	2015 XT_{383}	—	June 18, 2005	Mount Lemmon	Mount Lemmon Survey	·	2.4 km	MPC · JPL
562284	2015 XV_{383}	—	August 25, 2014	Haleakala	Pan-STARRS 1	EUN	1.1 km	MPC · JPL
562285	2015 XJ_{384}	—	December 15, 2015	XuYi	PMO NEO Survey Program	·	1.7 km	MPC · JPL
562286	2015 XG_{391}	—	May 12, 2008	Siding Spring	SSS	·	1.6 km	MPC · JPL
562287	2015 XE_{394}	—	August 23, 2003	Palomar	NEAT	V	690 m	MPC · JPL
562288	2015 XL_{394}	—	December 9, 2015	Haleakala	Pan-STARRS 1	KON	2.2 km	MPC · JPL
562289	2015 XU_{394}	—	May 20, 2005	Mount Lemmon	Mount Lemmon Survey	MAR	880 m	MPC · JPL
562290	2015 XX_{394}	—	October 9, 2010	Mount Lemmon	Mount Lemmon Survey	·	1.5 km	MPC · JPL
562291	2015 XB_{395}	—	April 13, 2008	Mount Lemmon	Mount Lemmon Survey	·	1.6 km	MPC · JPL
562292	2015 XE_{395}	—	October 2, 2014	Haleakala	Pan-STARRS 1	EUN	1 km	MPC · JPL
562293	2015 XM_{395}	—	November 6, 2010	Mount Lemmon	Mount Lemmon Survey	·	1.8 km	MPC · JPL
562294	2015 XN_{395}	—	December 9, 2015	Haleakala	Pan-STARRS 1	·	1.5 km	MPC · JPL
562295	2015 XQ_{395}	—	October 1, 2014	Haleakala	Pan-STARRS 1	·	2.2 km	MPC · JPL
562296	2015 XR_{395}	—	January 19, 2012	Catalina	CSS	·	1.6 km	MPC · JPL
562297	2015 XS_{395}	—	January 27, 2007	Mount Lemmon	Mount Lemmon Survey	·	1.8 km	MPC · JPL
562298	2015 XT_{395}	—	January 22, 2012	Haleakala	Pan-STARRS 1	·	1.2 km	MPC · JPL
562299	2015 XX_{395}	—	January 3, 2012	Mount Lemmon	Mount Lemmon Survey	·	1.2 km	MPC · JPL
562300	2015 XA_{396}	—	December 8, 2015	Mount Lemmon	Mount Lemmon Survey	JUN	800 m	MPC · JPL

== 562301–562400 ==
back to top

Designation			Discovery			Properties		Ref
Permanent	Provisional	Named after	Date	Site	Discoverer(s)	Category	Diam.	Ref
562301	2015 XE_{396}	—	August 18, 2009	Kitt Peak	Spacewatch	·	1.9 km	MPC · JPL
562302	2015 XL_{396}	—	December 14, 2010	ESA OGS	ESA OGS	·	1.8 km	MPC · JPL
562303	2015 XO_{396}	—	October 14, 2014	Mount Lemmon	Mount Lemmon Survey	·	1.1 km	MPC · JPL
562304	2015 XU_{396}	—	October 28, 2006	Mount Lemmon	Mount Lemmon Survey	·	1.1 km	MPC · JPL
562305	2015 XV_{396}	—	October 28, 2006	Catalina	CSS	·	2.1 km	MPC · JPL
562306	2015 XG_{397}	—	September 20, 2014	Haleakala	Pan-STARRS 1	·	1.6 km	MPC · JPL
562307	2015 XM_{397}	—	April 19, 2007	Mount Lemmon	Mount Lemmon Survey	·	1.6 km	MPC · JPL
562308	2015 XG_{398}	—	January 15, 2008	Mount Lemmon	Mount Lemmon Survey	·	1.1 km	MPC · JPL
562309	2015 XJ_{398}	—	December 29, 2011	Mount Lemmon	Mount Lemmon Survey	·	990 m	MPC · JPL
562310	2015 XP_{398}	—	February 23, 2007	Mount Lemmon	Mount Lemmon Survey	·	2.0 km	MPC · JPL
562311	2015 XT_{398}	—	April 27, 2012	Mount Lemmon	Mount Lemmon Survey	·	1.8 km	MPC · JPL
562312	2015 XV_{398}	—	September 19, 2014	Haleakala	Pan-STARRS 1	·	1.2 km	MPC · JPL
562313	2015 XA_{399}	—	August 13, 2002	Kitt Peak	Spacewatch	·	1.3 km	MPC · JPL
562314	2015 XJ_{399}	—	December 9, 2015	Haleakala	Pan-STARRS 1	HNS	940 m	MPC · JPL
562315	2015 XQ_{400}	—	September 27, 2009	Mount Lemmon	Mount Lemmon Survey	BRA	1.3 km	MPC · JPL
562316	2015 XY_{401}	—	March 16, 2012	Mount Lemmon	Mount Lemmon Survey	·	1.5 km	MPC · JPL
562317	2015 XE_{402}	—	October 31, 2010	Mount Lemmon	Mount Lemmon Survey	·	1.4 km	MPC · JPL
562318	2015 XF_{402}	—	December 13, 2015	Haleakala	Pan-STARRS 1	JUN	1.0 km	MPC · JPL
562319	2015 XU_{402}	—	November 26, 2003	Kitt Peak	Spacewatch	·	1.0 km	MPC · JPL
562320	2015 XV_{402}	—	December 29, 2003	Kitt Peak	Spacewatch	·	1.2 km	MPC · JPL
562321	2015 XK_{403}	—	February 23, 2012	Mount Lemmon	Mount Lemmon Survey	·	1.8 km	MPC · JPL
562322	2015 XM_{403}	—	April 11, 2003	Kitt Peak	Spacewatch	·	1.9 km	MPC · JPL
562323	2015 XQ_{403}	—	December 27, 2006	Mount Lemmon	Mount Lemmon Survey	·	1.5 km	MPC · JPL
562324	2015 XT_{403}	—	August 20, 2014	Haleakala	Pan-STARRS 1	·	1.2 km	MPC · JPL
562325	2015 XW_{403}	—	September 26, 2009	Kitt Peak	Spacewatch	ADE	1.6 km	MPC · JPL
562326	2015 XY_{403}	—	February 10, 2007	Catalina	CSS	·	1.7 km	MPC · JPL
562327	2015 XD_{404}	—	July 4, 2014	Haleakala	Pan-STARRS 1	·	1.4 km	MPC · JPL
562328	2015 XE_{404}	—	November 2, 2007	Mount Lemmon	Mount Lemmon Survey	·	1.1 km	MPC · JPL
562329	2015 XQ_{404}	—	January 19, 2012	Haleakala	Pan-STARRS 1	·	1.3 km	MPC · JPL
562330	2015 XS_{404}	—	September 2, 2010	Mount Lemmon	Mount Lemmon Survey	·	1 km	MPC · JPL
562331	2015 XW_{404}	—	May 10, 2013	Haleakala	Pan-STARRS 1	EUN	930 m	MPC · JPL
562332	2015 XA_{405}	—	March 3, 2003	Palomar	NEAT	·	2.0 km	MPC · JPL
562333	2015 XB_{405}	—	December 3, 2015	Mount Lemmon	Mount Lemmon Survey	·	1.3 km	MPC · JPL
562334	2015 XM_{405}	—	August 28, 2014	Haleakala	Pan-STARRS 1	HNS	1.2 km	MPC · JPL
562335	2015 XP_{405}	—	September 5, 2010	Mount Lemmon	Mount Lemmon Survey	·	1.8 km	MPC · JPL
562336	2015 XH_{406}	—	February 22, 2012	Kitt Peak	Spacewatch	EUN	1.1 km	MPC · JPL
562337	2015 XK_{406}	—	February 2, 2008	Kitt Peak	Spacewatch	EUN	820 m	MPC · JPL
562338	2015 XO_{406}	—	December 4, 2015	Mount Lemmon	Mount Lemmon Survey	EUN	910 m	MPC · JPL
562339	2015 XQ_{406}	—	September 23, 2014	Mount Lemmon	Mount Lemmon Survey	·	1.6 km	MPC · JPL
562340	2015 XV_{406}	—	May 12, 2013	Haleakala	Pan-STARRS 1	HNS	810 m	MPC · JPL
562341	2015 XW_{406}	—	December 4, 2015	Haleakala	Pan-STARRS 1	·	1.2 km	MPC · JPL
562342	2015 XE_{407}	—	April 1, 2013	Kitt Peak	Spacewatch	·	1.1 km	MPC · JPL
562343	2015 XM_{407}	—	August 29, 2005	Kitt Peak	Spacewatch	HNS	1.2 km	MPC · JPL
562344	2015 XO_{407}	—	September 1, 2010	Mount Lemmon	Mount Lemmon Survey	·	1.3 km	MPC · JPL
562345	2015 XV_{407}	—	September 5, 2010	Mount Lemmon	Mount Lemmon Survey	EUN	1.1 km	MPC · JPL
562346	2015 XZ_{407}	—	July 1, 2014	Haleakala	Pan-STARRS 1	·	1.2 km	MPC · JPL
562347	2015 XD_{408}	—	December 3, 2007	Kitt Peak	Spacewatch	·	1.0 km	MPC · JPL
562348	2015 XO_{408}	—	August 28, 2014	Haleakala	Pan-STARRS 1	·	1.5 km	MPC · JPL
562349	2015 XV_{408}	—	November 8, 2010	Kitt Peak	Spacewatch	·	1.6 km	MPC · JPL
562350	2015 XW_{408}	—	May 5, 2013	Mount Lemmon	Mount Lemmon Survey	EUN	1.0 km	MPC · JPL
562351	2015 XJ_{409}	—	November 8, 2010	Mount Lemmon	Mount Lemmon Survey	·	1.4 km	MPC · JPL
562352	2015 XM_{409}	—	January 31, 2004	Apache Point	SDSS Collaboration	MAR	1.0 km	MPC · JPL
562353	2015 XP_{409}	—	October 2, 2014	Haleakala	Pan-STARRS 1	·	1.5 km	MPC · JPL
562354	2015 XQ_{409}	—	November 12, 2005	Kitt Peak	Spacewatch	·	1.9 km	MPC · JPL
562355	2015 XZ_{410}	—	December 31, 2011	Mount Lemmon	Mount Lemmon Survey	·	1.3 km	MPC · JPL
562356	2015 XJ_{411}	—	December 6, 2007	Kitt Peak	Spacewatch	·	1.3 km	MPC · JPL
562357	2015 XO_{411}	—	December 8, 2015	Haleakala	Pan-STARRS 1	·	1.1 km	MPC · JPL
562358	2015 XZ_{411}	—	June 7, 2013	Haleakala	Pan-STARRS 1	·	850 m	MPC · JPL
562359	2015 XG_{412}	—	June 2, 2014	Haleakala	Pan-STARRS 1	·	1.3 km	MPC · JPL
562360	2015 XH_{412}	—	January 19, 2012	Haleakala	Pan-STARRS 1	·	1.5 km	MPC · JPL
562361	2015 XO_{412}	—	September 19, 2014	Haleakala	Pan-STARRS 1	·	1.7 km	MPC · JPL
562362	2015 XT_{412}	—	December 8, 2015	Haleakala	Pan-STARRS 1	·	1.2 km	MPC · JPL
562363	2015 XD_{413}	—	December 17, 2007	Mount Lemmon	Mount Lemmon Survey	KON	1.8 km	MPC · JPL
562364	2015 XP_{413}	—	January 28, 2009	Catalina	CSS	·	1.4 km	MPC · JPL
562365	2015 XT_{413}	—	November 23, 2011	Kitt Peak	Spacewatch	(5)	1.1 km	MPC · JPL
562366	2015 XZ_{413}	—	February 1, 2003	Palomar	NEAT	·	2.2 km	MPC · JPL
562367	2015 XP_{415}	—	July 15, 2013	Haleakala	Pan-STARRS 1	·	1.7 km	MPC · JPL
562368	2015 XV_{415}	—	July 31, 2014	Haleakala	Pan-STARRS 1	·	1.2 km	MPC · JPL
562369	2015 XR_{416}	—	March 30, 2012	Kitt Peak	Spacewatch	·	1.9 km	MPC · JPL
562370	2015 XT_{416}	—	December 12, 2015	Haleakala	Pan-STARRS 1	·	1.6 km	MPC · JPL
562371	2015 XY_{416}	—	November 27, 2006	Mount Lemmon	Mount Lemmon Survey	·	2.1 km	MPC · JPL
562372	2015 XE_{417}	—	February 10, 2007	Mount Lemmon	Mount Lemmon Survey	·	1.7 km	MPC · JPL
562373	2015 XG_{418}	—	October 2, 2014	Mount Lemmon	Mount Lemmon Survey	·	1.6 km	MPC · JPL
562374	2015 XZ_{418}	—	November 11, 2006	Kitt Peak	Spacewatch	·	1.2 km	MPC · JPL
562375	2015 XF_{419}	—	November 6, 2005	Kitt Peak	Spacewatch	·	2.4 km	MPC · JPL
562376	2015 XH_{419}	—	September 27, 2003	Kitt Peak	Spacewatch	·	1.7 km	MPC · JPL
562377	2015 XX_{419}	—	October 25, 2005	Kitt Peak	Spacewatch	·	1.6 km	MPC · JPL
562378	2015 XT_{420}	—	April 11, 2013	Kitt Peak	Spacewatch	·	1.1 km	MPC · JPL
562379	2015 XV_{420}	—	January 20, 2012	Mount Lemmon	Mount Lemmon Survey	BRG	1.2 km	MPC · JPL
562380	2015 XW_{420}	—	December 14, 2015	Mount Lemmon	Mount Lemmon Survey	EUN	1.2 km	MPC · JPL
562381	2015 XY_{420}	—	November 20, 2006	Kitt Peak	Spacewatch	·	1.2 km	MPC · JPL
562382	2015 XB_{421}	—	November 19, 2006	Catalina	CSS	·	1.7 km	MPC · JPL
562383	2015 XD_{421}	—	July 25, 2014	Haleakala	Pan-STARRS 1	·	830 m	MPC · JPL
562384	2015 XE_{421}	—	December 14, 2015	Haleakala	Pan-STARRS 1	EUN	1.1 km	MPC · JPL
562385	2015 XH_{421}	—	December 4, 2007	Mount Lemmon	Mount Lemmon Survey	·	900 m	MPC · JPL
562386	2015 XX_{421}	—	December 4, 2015	Haleakala	Pan-STARRS 1	·	2.5 km	MPC · JPL
562387	2015 XZ_{421}	—	November 2, 2015	Mount Lemmon	Mount Lemmon Survey	EUN	1.1 km	MPC · JPL
562388	2015 XS_{422}	—	December 13, 2015	Haleakala	Pan-STARRS 1	·	1.4 km	MPC · JPL
562389	2015 XH_{440}	—	December 8, 2015	Haleakala	Pan-STARRS 1	(5)	1.1 km	MPC · JPL
562390	2015 XP_{443}	—	December 10, 2015	Mount Lemmon	Mount Lemmon Survey	·	1.4 km	MPC · JPL
562391	2015 XR_{443}	—	December 7, 2015	Haleakala	Pan-STARRS 1	·	810 m	MPC · JPL
562392	2015 XK_{444}	—	December 7, 2015	Haleakala	Pan-STARRS 1	·	1.2 km	MPC · JPL
562393	2015 XZ_{446}	—	December 8, 2015	Haleakala	Pan-STARRS 1	·	850 m	MPC · JPL
562394	2015 XB_{449}	—	June 28, 2014	Haleakala	Pan-STARRS 1	V	480 m	MPC · JPL
562395	2015 XX_{452}	—	December 14, 2015	Haleakala	Pan-STARRS 1	·	2.9 km	MPC · JPL
562396	2015 XZ_{455}	—	September 21, 2009	Mount Lemmon	Mount Lemmon Survey	·	2.6 km	MPC · JPL
562397	2015 XA_{458}	—	December 9, 2015	Mount Lemmon	Mount Lemmon Survey	EOS	1.3 km	MPC · JPL
562398	2015 XA_{467}	—	December 9, 2015	Mount Lemmon	Mount Lemmon Survey	·	1.3 km	MPC · JPL
562399	2015 XS_{467}	—	December 13, 2015	Haleakala	Pan-STARRS 1	EOS	1.6 km	MPC · JPL
562400	2015 YL_{1}	—	August 27, 2014	Haleakala	Pan-STARRS 1	BAR	1.2 km	MPC · JPL

== 562401–562500 ==
back to top

Designation			Discovery			Properties		Ref
Permanent	Provisional	Named after	Date	Site	Discoverer(s)	Category	Diam.	Ref
562401	2015 YG_{2}	—	October 23, 2006	Catalina	CSS	JUN	1.1 km	MPC · JPL
562402	2015 YY_{2}	—	September 19, 2015	Haleakala	Pan-STARRS 1	·	1.3 km	MPC · JPL
562403	2015 YD_{4}	—	December 16, 2015	Mount Lemmon	Mount Lemmon Survey	EUN	1.1 km	MPC · JPL
562404	2015 YT_{4}	—	February 25, 2012	Catalina	CSS	·	1.6 km	MPC · JPL
562405	2015 YL_{5}	—	December 18, 2001	Socorro	LINEAR	(18466)	1.8 km	MPC · JPL
562406	2015 YN_{5}	—	November 28, 2002	Haleakala	NEAT	·	1.4 km	MPC · JPL
562407	2015 YP_{5}	—	December 9, 2015	Haleakala	Pan-STARRS 1	·	1.6 km	MPC · JPL
562408	2015 YR_{5}	—	October 29, 2006	Catalina	CSS	JUN	1.0 km	MPC · JPL
562409	2015 YC_{6}	—	March 12, 2008	Mount Lemmon	Mount Lemmon Survey	(5)	1.1 km	MPC · JPL
562410	2015 YO_{6}	—	September 19, 2006	Catalina	CSS	MAR	1.2 km	MPC · JPL
562411	2015 YH_{7}	—	December 13, 2006	Kitt Peak	Spacewatch	·	1.2 km	MPC · JPL
562412	2015 YD_{9}	—	July 28, 2014	Haleakala	Pan-STARRS 1	(5)	960 m	MPC · JPL
562413	2015 YF_{9}	—	September 25, 2014	Charleston	R. Holmes	·	1.8 km	MPC · JPL
562414	2015 YL_{9}	—	July 25, 2014	Haleakala	Pan-STARRS 1	·	1.4 km	MPC · JPL
562415	2015 YS_{10}	—	January 29, 2012	Mount Lemmon	Mount Lemmon Survey	·	1.2 km	MPC · JPL
562416	2015 YV_{10}	—	January 23, 2012	Catalina	CSS	·	1.5 km	MPC · JPL
562417	2015 YZ_{10}	—	February 18, 2008	Mount Lemmon	Mount Lemmon Survey	·	1.9 km	MPC · JPL
562418	2015 YP_{11}	—	September 15, 2007	Mount Lemmon	Mount Lemmon Survey	PHO	930 m	MPC · JPL
562419	2015 YV_{11}	—	May 30, 2014	Haleakala	Pan-STARRS 1	·	1.0 km	MPC · JPL
562420	2015 YX_{11}	—	August 29, 2006	Kitt Peak	Spacewatch	·	1.2 km	MPC · JPL
562421	2015 YV_{12}	—	December 30, 2008	Mount Lemmon	Mount Lemmon Survey	EUN	1.4 km	MPC · JPL
562422	2015 YQ_{13}	—	December 31, 2015	Haleakala	Pan-STARRS 1	·	1.7 km	MPC · JPL
562423	2015 YG_{14}	—	March 13, 2004	Palomar	NEAT	·	1.1 km	MPC · JPL
562424	2015 YN_{14}	—	February 12, 2012	Mount Lemmon	Mount Lemmon Survey	·	1.2 km	MPC · JPL
562425	2015 YR_{14}	—	June 1, 2013	Mount Lemmon	Mount Lemmon Survey	HNS	1.1 km	MPC · JPL
562426	2015 YG_{15}	—	November 17, 2006	Kitt Peak	Spacewatch	·	1.3 km	MPC · JPL
562427	2015 YJ_{15}	—	December 3, 2015	Haleakala	Pan-STARRS 1	MAR	1.1 km	MPC · JPL
562428	2015 YM_{15}	—	February 1, 2012	Catalina	CSS	BRU	2.3 km	MPC · JPL
562429	2015 YS_{15}	—	July 4, 2014	Haleakala	Pan-STARRS 1	·	1.1 km	MPC · JPL
562430	2015 YB_{16}	—	December 5, 2015	Haleakala	Pan-STARRS 1	·	1.2 km	MPC · JPL
562431	2015 YO_{16}	—	December 4, 2015	Mount Lemmon	Mount Lemmon Survey	HNS	1.2 km	MPC · JPL
562432	2015 YZ_{16}	—	October 1, 2014	Haleakala	Pan-STARRS 1	·	1.2 km	MPC · JPL
562433	2015 YA_{17}	—	October 14, 2010	Catalina	CSS	·	1.6 km	MPC · JPL
562434	2015 YU_{17}	—	October 17, 2010	Mount Lemmon	Mount Lemmon Survey	·	1.4 km	MPC · JPL
562435	2015 YW_{17}	—	December 7, 2015	Haleakala	Pan-STARRS 1	·	1.6 km	MPC · JPL
562436	2015 YG_{19}	—	March 31, 2013	Mount Lemmon	Mount Lemmon Survey	·	1.3 km	MPC · JPL
562437	2015 YM_{19}	—	November 14, 2002	Palomar	NEAT	·	1.4 km	MPC · JPL
562438	2015 YW_{19}	—	December 16, 2011	Mount Lemmon	Mount Lemmon Survey	·	1.2 km	MPC · JPL
562439	2015 YF_{20}	—	November 26, 2011	Mount Lemmon	Mount Lemmon Survey	·	1.4 km	MPC · JPL
562440	2015 YJ_{20}	—	November 18, 2007	Mount Lemmon	Mount Lemmon Survey	·	1.6 km	MPC · JPL
562441	2015 YQ_{20}	—	September 13, 2005	Kitt Peak	Spacewatch	·	1.5 km	MPC · JPL
562442	2015 YZ_{21}	—	December 14, 2001	Kitt Peak	Spacewatch	GEF	1.2 km	MPC · JPL
562443	2015 YE_{23}	—	April 20, 2009	Mount Lemmon	Mount Lemmon Survey	·	1.3 km	MPC · JPL
562444	2015 YM_{23}	—	December 13, 2006	Mount Lemmon	Mount Lemmon Survey	·	1.5 km	MPC · JPL
562445	2015 YO_{23}	—	January 10, 2007	Mount Lemmon	Mount Lemmon Survey	·	1.7 km	MPC · JPL
562446 Pilinszky	2015 YR_{23}	Pilinszky	September 30, 2014	Piszkéstető	K. Sárneczky, P. Székely	·	1.4 km	MPC · JPL
562447	2015 YV_{23}	—	February 20, 2012	Haleakala	Pan-STARRS 1	·	1.4 km	MPC · JPL
562448	2015 YW_{23}	—	December 26, 1998	Kitt Peak	Spacewatch	·	1.2 km	MPC · JPL
562449	2015 YY_{23}	—	December 9, 2015	Mount Lemmon	Mount Lemmon Survey	BRG	1.3 km	MPC · JPL
562450	2015 YV_{24}	—	September 12, 2009	Kitt Peak	Spacewatch	·	2.0 km	MPC · JPL
562451	2015 YF_{25}	—	November 5, 2010	Mount Lemmon	Mount Lemmon Survey	·	1.6 km	MPC · JPL
562452	2015 YL_{25}	—	July 4, 2014	Haleakala	Pan-STARRS 1	EUN	930 m	MPC · JPL
562453	2015 YQ_{25}	—	August 1, 2005	Campo Imperatore	CINEOS	·	1.8 km	MPC · JPL
562454	2015 YB_{26}	—	September 29, 2014	Haleakala	Pan-STARRS 1	·	1.6 km	MPC · JPL
562455	2015 YD_{26}	—	May 4, 2000	Apache Point	SDSS Collaboration	MAR	1.2 km	MPC · JPL
562456	2015 YK_{27}	—	December 21, 2006	Kitt Peak	Spacewatch	·	1.6 km	MPC · JPL
562457	2015 YX_{27}	—	November 22, 2006	Kitt Peak	Spacewatch	EUN	1 km	MPC · JPL
562458	2015 YY_{27}	—	August 30, 2005	Kitt Peak	Spacewatch	·	1.8 km	MPC · JPL
562459	2015 YE_{28}	—	December 24, 2015	Haleakala	Pan-STARRS 1	BAR	1.2 km	MPC · JPL
562460	2015 YQ_{28}	—	December 21, 2015	Mount Lemmon	Mount Lemmon Survey	·	1.3 km	MPC · JPL
562461	2015 YY_{31}	—	December 31, 2015	Haleakala	Pan-STARRS 1	(194)	1.4 km	MPC · JPL
562462	2016 AD	—	January 4, 2003	Socorro	LINEAR	·	1.4 km	MPC · JPL
562463	2016 AV	—	November 23, 2015	Haleakala	Pan-STARRS 1	H	430 m	MPC · JPL
562464	2016 AB_{1}	—	December 7, 2015	Haleakala	Pan-STARRS 1	·	840 m	MPC · JPL
562465	2016 AK_{1}	—	February 10, 2008	Mount Lemmon	Mount Lemmon Survey	·	1.5 km	MPC · JPL
562466	2016 AO_{2}	—	March 13, 2012	Mount Lemmon	Mount Lemmon Survey	·	1.3 km	MPC · JPL
562467	2016 AB_{3}	—	October 8, 2015	Haleakala	Pan-STARRS 1	·	1.0 km	MPC · JPL
562468	2016 AK_{3}	—	October 1, 2005	Mount Lemmon	Mount Lemmon Survey	·	1.4 km	MPC · JPL
562469	2016 AQ_{3}	—	January 20, 2012	Haleakala	Pan-STARRS 1	·	1.4 km	MPC · JPL
562470	2016 AR_{3}	—	November 14, 2006	Catalina	CSS	·	1.8 km	MPC · JPL
562471	2016 AT_{3}	—	December 13, 2006	Kitt Peak	Spacewatch	·	1.8 km	MPC · JPL
562472	2016 AY_{3}	—	January 2, 2012	Mount Lemmon	Mount Lemmon Survey	·	1.4 km	MPC · JPL
562473	2016 AP_{4}	—	December 14, 2006	Mount Lemmon	Mount Lemmon Survey	·	2.7 km	MPC · JPL
562474	2016 AV_{5}	—	April 24, 2004	Kitt Peak	Spacewatch	·	1.5 km	MPC · JPL
562475	2016 AW_{5}	—	November 6, 2010	Mount Lemmon	Mount Lemmon Survey	·	1.6 km	MPC · JPL
562476	2016 AA_{6}	—	November 11, 2010	Kitt Peak	Spacewatch	·	2.1 km	MPC · JPL
562477	2016 AH_{6}	—	October 29, 2005	Mount Lemmon	Mount Lemmon Survey	AGN	1.2 km	MPC · JPL
562478	2016 AZ_{6}	—	December 26, 2006	Kitt Peak	Spacewatch	AGN	1.3 km	MPC · JPL
562479	2016 AA_{7}	—	November 14, 2015	Mount Lemmon	Mount Lemmon Survey	·	1.5 km	MPC · JPL
562480	2016 AB_{7}	—	January 27, 2012	Mount Lemmon	Mount Lemmon Survey	·	1.4 km	MPC · JPL
562481	2016 AF_{7}	—	January 19, 2012	Haleakala	Pan-STARRS 1	EUN	1.2 km	MPC · JPL
562482	2016 AG_{7}	—	November 6, 2002	Palomar	NEAT	EUN	1.3 km	MPC · JPL
562483	2016 AS_{7}	—	February 28, 2012	Haleakala	Pan-STARRS 1	·	1.2 km	MPC · JPL
562484	2016 AP_{10}	—	December 1, 2006	Mount Lemmon	Mount Lemmon Survey	·	1.3 km	MPC · JPL
562485	2016 AE_{11}	—	November 5, 2010	Mount Lemmon	Mount Lemmon Survey	·	2.0 km	MPC · JPL
562486	2016 AT_{11}	—	November 19, 2006	Catalina	CSS	EUN	1.2 km	MPC · JPL
562487	2016 AB_{12}	—	February 4, 2012	Haleakala	Pan-STARRS 1	BRG	1.4 km	MPC · JPL
562488	2016 AU_{13}	—	January 15, 2007	Mauna Kea	P. A. Wiegert	·	1.1 km	MPC · JPL
562489	2016 AY_{14}	—	October 20, 2006	Kitt Peak	Spacewatch	·	1.1 km	MPC · JPL
562490	2016 AS_{18}	—	December 13, 2006	Mount Lemmon	Mount Lemmon Survey	WIT	1.0 km	MPC · JPL
562491	2016 AH_{20}	—	December 14, 2015	Mount Lemmon	Mount Lemmon Survey	EOS	1.7 km	MPC · JPL
562492	2016 AX_{20}	—	September 17, 2006	Kitt Peak	Spacewatch	(5)	1.2 km	MPC · JPL
562493	2016 AY_{23}	—	January 21, 2012	Kitt Peak	Spacewatch	WIT	740 m	MPC · JPL
562494	2016 AL_{24}	—	December 27, 2006	Mount Lemmon	Mount Lemmon Survey	·	1.9 km	MPC · JPL
562495	2016 AT_{25}	—	January 3, 2016	Haleakala	Pan-STARRS 1	·	1.5 km	MPC · JPL
562496	2016 AW_{25}	—	March 12, 2007	Mount Lemmon	Mount Lemmon Survey	·	1.7 km	MPC · JPL
562497	2016 AU_{26}	—	July 25, 2014	Haleakala	Pan-STARRS 1	·	1.3 km	MPC · JPL
562498	2016 AA_{27}	—	December 14, 2010	Mount Lemmon	Mount Lemmon Survey	DOR	2.3 km	MPC · JPL
562499	2016 AC_{27}	—	September 30, 2006	Mount Lemmon	Mount Lemmon Survey	(5)	950 m	MPC · JPL
562500	2016 AJ_{28}	—	November 24, 2006	Mount Lemmon	Mount Lemmon Survey	·	1.1 km	MPC · JPL

== 562501–562600 ==
back to top

Designation			Discovery			Properties		Ref
Permanent	Provisional	Named after	Date	Site	Discoverer(s)	Category	Diam.	Ref
562501	2016 AS_{29}	—	December 27, 2006	Kitt Peak	Spacewatch	·	2.1 km	MPC · JPL
562502	2016 AF_{30}	—	December 10, 2015	Oukaïmeden	M. Ory	·	1.5 km	MPC · JPL
562503	2016 AK_{30}	—	January 10, 2007	Mount Lemmon	Mount Lemmon Survey	AEO	880 m	MPC · JPL
562504	2016 AJ_{31}	—	February 20, 2012	Haleakala	Pan-STARRS 1	·	1.7 km	MPC · JPL
562505	2016 AF_{32}	—	October 9, 2007	Kitt Peak	Spacewatch	NYS	890 m	MPC · JPL
562506	2016 AD_{33}	—	December 3, 2015	Mount Lemmon	Mount Lemmon Survey	·	1.4 km	MPC · JPL
562507	2016 AE_{35}	—	January 20, 2012	Kitt Peak	Spacewatch	·	1.3 km	MPC · JPL
562508	2016 AJ_{36}	—	March 28, 2008	Kitt Peak	Spacewatch	·	1.2 km	MPC · JPL
562509	2016 AR_{36}	—	April 10, 2002	Palomar	NEAT	·	2.5 km	MPC · JPL
562510	2016 AE_{37}	—	March 31, 2008	Kitt Peak	Spacewatch	·	1.3 km	MPC · JPL
562511	2016 AG_{38}	—	November 14, 2010	Kitt Peak	Spacewatch	DOR	2.2 km	MPC · JPL
562512	2016 AO_{39}	—	September 19, 2010	Bergisch Gladbach	W. Bickel	·	1.6 km	MPC · JPL
562513	2016 AL_{41}	—	March 6, 2011	Mount Lemmon	Mount Lemmon Survey	THM	1.7 km	MPC · JPL
562514	2016 AW_{41}	—	January 3, 2016	Mount Lemmon	Mount Lemmon Survey	·	1.7 km	MPC · JPL
562515	2016 AE_{42}	—	October 11, 2007	Catalina	CSS	·	1.5 km	MPC · JPL
562516	2016 AS_{42}	—	November 11, 2010	Mount Lemmon	Mount Lemmon Survey	AGN	1.1 km	MPC · JPL
562517	2016 AU_{42}	—	September 18, 2014	Haleakala	Pan-STARRS 1	(5)	1.0 km	MPC · JPL
562518	2016 AX_{42}	—	April 14, 2008	Mount Lemmon	Mount Lemmon Survey	·	1.3 km	MPC · JPL
562519	2016 AE_{43}	—	December 25, 2010	Mount Lemmon	Mount Lemmon Survey	·	2.1 km	MPC · JPL
562520	2016 AR_{43}	—	August 28, 2014	Haleakala	Pan-STARRS 1	·	1.7 km	MPC · JPL
562521	2016 AA_{44}	—	November 6, 2015	Mount Lemmon	Mount Lemmon Survey	·	1.7 km	MPC · JPL
562522	2016 AO_{44}	—	January 28, 2007	Mount Lemmon	Mount Lemmon Survey	·	1.6 km	MPC · JPL
562523	2016 AP_{45}	—	October 2, 2006	Kitt Peak	Spacewatch	·	980 m	MPC · JPL
562524	2016 AQ_{45}	—	December 31, 2007	Mount Lemmon	Mount Lemmon Survey	·	1.1 km	MPC · JPL
562525	2016 AM_{47}	—	January 21, 2012	Kitt Peak	Spacewatch	ADE	1.9 km	MPC · JPL
562526	2016 AF_{48}	—	March 30, 2008	Kitt Peak	Spacewatch	·	1.6 km	MPC · JPL
562527	2016 AV_{48}	—	February 9, 2008	Kitt Peak	Spacewatch	·	1.6 km	MPC · JPL
562528	2016 AB_{50}	—	December 30, 2015	Mount Lemmon	Mount Lemmon Survey	·	1.7 km	MPC · JPL
562529	2016 AG_{50}	—	October 13, 2010	Mount Lemmon	Mount Lemmon Survey	·	1.5 km	MPC · JPL
562530	2016 AU_{50}	—	January 1, 2012	Mount Lemmon	Mount Lemmon Survey	·	900 m	MPC · JPL
562531	2016 AL_{51}	—	March 14, 2012	Mount Lemmon	Mount Lemmon Survey	·	2.1 km	MPC · JPL
562532	2016 AD_{52}	—	January 11, 2008	Kitt Peak	Spacewatch	·	1.1 km	MPC · JPL
562533	2016 AH_{52}	—	December 22, 2006	Kitt Peak	Spacewatch	·	1.1 km	MPC · JPL
562534	2016 AK_{52}	—	October 7, 2007	Mount Lemmon	Mount Lemmon Survey	NYS	760 m	MPC · JPL
562535	2016 AP_{53}	—	January 2, 2008	Bergisch Gladbach	W. Bickel	·	1.1 km	MPC · JPL
562536	2016 AX_{53}	—	October 24, 2003	Kitt Peak	Spacewatch	·	1.0 km	MPC · JPL
562537	2016 AU_{54}	—	October 9, 2010	Mount Lemmon	Mount Lemmon Survey	WIT	870 m	MPC · JPL
562538	2016 AW_{55}	—	March 8, 2005	Mount Lemmon	Mount Lemmon Survey	NYS	1.2 km	MPC · JPL
562539	2016 AE_{56}	—	November 22, 2006	Kitt Peak	Spacewatch	·	1.4 km	MPC · JPL
562540	2016 AJ_{56}	—	December 13, 2006	Kitt Peak	Spacewatch	·	1.6 km	MPC · JPL
562541	2016 AL_{56}	—	February 23, 2007	Kitt Peak	Spacewatch	·	1.5 km	MPC · JPL
562542	2016 AB_{57}	—	October 11, 2001	Kitt Peak	Spacewatch	·	1.4 km	MPC · JPL
562543	2016 AG_{57}	—	November 3, 2010	Mount Lemmon	Mount Lemmon Survey	·	1.2 km	MPC · JPL
562544	2016 AJ_{57}	—	August 25, 2014	Haleakala	Pan-STARRS 1	·	2.1 km	MPC · JPL
562545	2016 AY_{57}	—	October 28, 2010	Mount Lemmon	Mount Lemmon Survey	·	1.4 km	MPC · JPL
562546	2016 AZ_{58}	—	November 15, 2010	Mount Lemmon	Mount Lemmon Survey	·	2.3 km	MPC · JPL
562547	2016 AC_{59}	—	April 17, 2009	Catalina	CSS	·	1.6 km	MPC · JPL
562548	2016 AL_{60}	—	December 1, 2006	Mount Lemmon	Mount Lemmon Survey	·	1.4 km	MPC · JPL
562549	2016 AR_{61}	—	January 4, 2016	Haleakala	Pan-STARRS 1	·	1.3 km	MPC · JPL
562550	2016 AT_{61}	—	November 20, 2006	Kitt Peak	Spacewatch	·	1.6 km	MPC · JPL
562551	2016 AZ_{62}	—	September 22, 2011	Kitt Peak	Spacewatch	NYS	700 m	MPC · JPL
562552	2016 AL_{63}	—	November 18, 2006	Kitt Peak	Spacewatch	·	1.2 km	MPC · JPL
562553	2016 AO_{63}	—	January 4, 2016	Haleakala	Pan-STARRS 1	·	1.5 km	MPC · JPL
562554	2016 AY_{63}	—	September 26, 2006	Catalina	CSS	·	1.4 km	MPC · JPL
562555	2016 AF_{64}	—	May 17, 2013	Mount Lemmon	Mount Lemmon Survey	·	810 m	MPC · JPL
562556	2016 AC_{67}	—	December 26, 2011	Mount Lemmon	Mount Lemmon Survey	·	980 m	MPC · JPL
562557	2016 AM_{67}	—	December 12, 2014	Haleakala	Pan-STARRS 1	L5	10 km	MPC · JPL
562558	2016 AN_{67}	—	October 12, 2005	Kitt Peak	Spacewatch	·	1.6 km	MPC · JPL
562559	2016 AO_{70}	—	October 1, 2014	Haleakala	Pan-STARRS 1	·	1.5 km	MPC · JPL
562560	2016 AU_{71}	—	November 27, 2011	Mount Lemmon	Mount Lemmon Survey	·	1.4 km	MPC · JPL
562561	2016 AM_{72}	—	October 30, 2010	Kitt Peak	Spacewatch	·	2.1 km	MPC · JPL
562562	2016 AX_{72}	—	December 12, 2015	Haleakala	Pan-STARRS 1	·	1.1 km	MPC · JPL
562563	2016 AP_{73}	—	December 25, 2010	Mount Lemmon	Mount Lemmon Survey	·	2.0 km	MPC · JPL
562564	2016 AY_{73}	—	August 25, 2014	Haleakala	Pan-STARRS 1	·	1.8 km	MPC · JPL
562565	2016 AS_{74}	—	March 13, 2012	Mount Lemmon	Mount Lemmon Survey	·	1.3 km	MPC · JPL
562566	2016 AB_{75}	—	November 22, 2014	Haleakala	Pan-STARRS 1	·	2.2 km	MPC · JPL
562567	2016 AW_{75}	—	November 16, 2006	Catalina	CSS	·	2.0 km	MPC · JPL
562568	2016 AM_{76}	—	September 10, 2010	Mount Lemmon	Mount Lemmon Survey	·	1.3 km	MPC · JPL
562569	2016 AT_{76}	—	January 26, 2012	Kitt Peak	Spacewatch	·	1.2 km	MPC · JPL
562570	2016 AF_{77}	—	October 28, 2010	Mount Lemmon	Mount Lemmon Survey	·	1.6 km	MPC · JPL
562571	2016 AF_{79}	—	August 23, 2014	Haleakala	Pan-STARRS 1	·	1.2 km	MPC · JPL
562572	2016 AY_{79}	—	August 30, 2000	La Silla	Barbieri, C.	·	1.6 km	MPC · JPL
562573	2016 AY_{81}	—	March 22, 2012	Mount Lemmon	Mount Lemmon Survey	·	1.4 km	MPC · JPL
562574	2016 AH_{82}	—	March 23, 2006	Mount Lemmon	Mount Lemmon Survey	·	1.3 km	MPC · JPL
562575	2016 AV_{82}	—	September 23, 2015	Haleakala	Pan-STARRS 1	EUN	1.2 km	MPC · JPL
562576	2016 AJ_{83}	—	December 18, 2007	Uccle	T. Pauwels	·	1.5 km	MPC · JPL
562577	2016 AC_{84}	—	January 4, 2012	Mount Lemmon	Mount Lemmon Survey	·	1.2 km	MPC · JPL
562578	2016 AR_{84}	—	December 1, 2008	Mount Lemmon	Mount Lemmon Survey	V	500 m	MPC · JPL
562579	2016 AG_{85}	—	March 8, 2008	Kitt Peak	Spacewatch	·	1.2 km	MPC · JPL
562580	2016 AM_{87}	—	October 28, 2002	Palomar	NEAT	·	1.3 km	MPC · JPL
562581	2016 AQ_{87}	—	August 22, 2014	Haleakala	Pan-STARRS 1	EOS	2.2 km	MPC · JPL
562582	2016 AS_{87}	—	December 15, 2007	Mount Lemmon	Mount Lemmon Survey	(5)	1.1 km	MPC · JPL
562583	2016 AT_{87}	—	October 12, 2007	Mount Lemmon	Mount Lemmon Survey	·	1.4 km	MPC · JPL
562584	2016 AZ_{87}	—	September 15, 2007	Kitt Peak	Spacewatch	·	960 m	MPC · JPL
562585	2016 AG_{88}	—	October 28, 2014	Haleakala	Pan-STARRS 1	L5	9.5 km	MPC · JPL
562586	2016 AZ_{88}	—	September 4, 2010	Mount Lemmon	Mount Lemmon Survey	·	1.6 km	MPC · JPL
562587	2016 AV_{89}	—	February 3, 2008	Kitt Peak	Spacewatch	·	1.1 km	MPC · JPL
562588	2016 AJ_{90}	—	May 21, 2014	Haleakala	Pan-STARRS 1	·	1.0 km	MPC · JPL
562589	2016 AR_{90}	—	December 9, 2015	Haleakala	Pan-STARRS 1	·	880 m	MPC · JPL
562590	2016 AH_{93}	—	December 24, 2015	Haleakala	Pan-STARRS 1	·	1.9 km	MPC · JPL
562591	2016 AW_{93}	—	November 7, 2010	Mount Lemmon	Mount Lemmon Survey	·	2.5 km	MPC · JPL
562592	2016 AZ_{94}	—	August 25, 2014	Haleakala	Pan-STARRS 1	·	1.4 km	MPC · JPL
562593	2016 AH_{95}	—	December 18, 2001	Socorro	LINEAR	·	2.0 km	MPC · JPL
562594	2016 AJ_{96}	—	June 18, 2013	Haleakala	Pan-STARRS 1	·	1.5 km	MPC · JPL
562595	2016 AL_{96}	—	February 6, 2008	Catalina	CSS	·	1.1 km	MPC · JPL
562596	2016 AQ_{96}	—	February 25, 2012	Mayhill-ISON	L. Elenin	·	1.7 km	MPC · JPL
562597	2016 AT_{96}	—	March 13, 2013	Flagstaff	Flagstaff	·	890 m	MPC · JPL
562598	2016 AM_{99}	—	October 4, 2014	Mount Lemmon	Mount Lemmon Survey	·	1.8 km	MPC · JPL
562599	2016 AP_{99}	—	February 7, 2002	Kitt Peak	Spacewatch	·	1.8 km	MPC · JPL
562600	2016 AC_{100}	—	January 28, 2007	Kitt Peak	Spacewatch	·	1.8 km	MPC · JPL

== 562601–562700 ==
back to top

Designation			Discovery			Properties		Ref
Permanent	Provisional	Named after	Date	Site	Discoverer(s)	Category	Diam.	Ref
562601	2016 AW_{100}	—	January 27, 2007	Kitt Peak	Spacewatch	MRX	910 m	MPC · JPL
562602	2016 AK_{101}	—	September 30, 2014	Mount Lemmon	Mount Lemmon Survey	·	1.6 km	MPC · JPL
562603	2016 AC_{102}	—	November 12, 2010	Mount Lemmon	Mount Lemmon Survey	EUN	1.2 km	MPC · JPL
562604	2016 AD_{103}	—	February 23, 2007	Kitt Peak	Spacewatch	·	1.8 km	MPC · JPL
562605	2016 AY_{103}	—	March 27, 2012	Mount Lemmon	Mount Lemmon Survey	·	2.0 km	MPC · JPL
562606	2016 AC_{104}	—	April 27, 2012	Haleakala	Pan-STARRS 1	·	1.8 km	MPC · JPL
562607	2016 AH_{104}	—	October 19, 2006	Kitt Peak	Spacewatch	·	1.3 km	MPC · JPL
562608	2016 AE_{105}	—	March 14, 2007	Kitt Peak	Spacewatch	KOR	1.1 km	MPC · JPL
562609	2016 AM_{105}	—	October 1, 2005	Mount Lemmon	Mount Lemmon Survey	·	1.5 km	MPC · JPL
562610	2016 AO_{105}	—	January 7, 2016	Haleakala	Pan-STARRS 1	·	1.9 km	MPC · JPL
562611	2016 AD_{106}	—	December 21, 2006	Mount Lemmon	Mount Lemmon Survey	·	1.2 km	MPC · JPL
562612	2016 AJ_{106}	—	September 2, 2014	Mount Lemmon	Mount Lemmon Survey	·	980 m	MPC · JPL
562613	2016 AA_{107}	—	February 13, 2008	Kitt Peak	Spacewatch	MAR	680 m	MPC · JPL
562614	2016 AD_{108}	—	November 1, 2010	Kitt Peak	Spacewatch	·	1.3 km	MPC · JPL
562615	2016 AL_{108}	—	October 28, 2010	Mount Lemmon	Mount Lemmon Survey	·	1.4 km	MPC · JPL
562616	2016 AF_{109}	—	October 25, 2005	Kitt Peak	Spacewatch	·	1.4 km	MPC · JPL
562617	2016 AK_{109}	—	November 14, 2010	Mount Lemmon	Mount Lemmon Survey	WIT	870 m	MPC · JPL
562618	2016 AO_{109}	—	October 25, 2014	Mount Lemmon	Mount Lemmon Survey	·	1.3 km	MPC · JPL
562619	2016 AQ_{109}	—	October 5, 2002	Palomar	NEAT	·	1.1 km	MPC · JPL
562620	2016 AW_{109}	—	April 28, 2012	Mount Lemmon	Mount Lemmon Survey	·	1.7 km	MPC · JPL
562621	2016 AY_{112}	—	November 3, 2010	Mayhill-ISON	L. Elenin	·	1.2 km	MPC · JPL
562622	2016 AB_{114}	—	January 5, 2003	Socorro	LINEAR	JUN	1.1 km	MPC · JPL
562623	2016 AE_{114}	—	July 30, 2009	Kitt Peak	Spacewatch	·	2.2 km	MPC · JPL
562624	2016 AM_{114}	—	November 18, 2006	Mount Lemmon	Mount Lemmon Survey	·	1.9 km	MPC · JPL
562625	2016 AR_{114}	—	June 6, 2013	Mount Lemmon	Mount Lemmon Survey	·	1.6 km	MPC · JPL
562626	2016 AW_{114}	—	February 21, 2002	Kitt Peak	Spacewatch	·	1.6 km	MPC · JPL
562627	2016 AC_{115}	—	October 2, 2014	Haleakala	Pan-STARRS 1	·	2.3 km	MPC · JPL
562628	2016 AN_{116}	—	August 6, 2014	Haleakala	Pan-STARRS 1	·	1.6 km	MPC · JPL
562629	2016 AQ_{116}	—	January 27, 2007	Kitt Peak	Spacewatch	·	1.7 km	MPC · JPL
562630	2016 AH_{118}	—	September 19, 2009	Kitt Peak	Spacewatch	·	1.9 km	MPC · JPL
562631	2016 AG_{119}	—	January 8, 2016	Haleakala	Pan-STARRS 1	EOS	1.3 km	MPC · JPL
562632	2016 AS_{119}	—	October 13, 2005	Bergisch Gladbach	W. Bickel	·	1.7 km	MPC · JPL
562633	2016 AU_{119}	—	June 26, 2014	Mount Lemmon	Mount Lemmon Survey	JUN	1.1 km	MPC · JPL
562634	2016 AC_{120}	—	December 14, 2010	Mount Lemmon	Mount Lemmon Survey	AEO	930 m	MPC · JPL
562635	2016 AK_{120}	—	January 8, 2016	Haleakala	Pan-STARRS 1	·	1.3 km	MPC · JPL
562636	2016 AM_{120}	—	February 22, 2007	Kitt Peak	Spacewatch	EUN	870 m	MPC · JPL
562637	2016 AH_{121}	—	February 26, 2012	Mount Lemmon	Mount Lemmon Survey	·	1.2 km	MPC · JPL
562638	2016 AO_{121}	—	January 27, 2007	Kitt Peak	Spacewatch	NEM	2.4 km	MPC · JPL
562639	2016 AW_{121}	—	October 29, 2014	Haleakala	Pan-STARRS 1	PAD	1.5 km	MPC · JPL
562640	2016 AX_{121}	—	February 22, 2002	Palomar	NEAT	·	2.2 km	MPC · JPL
562641	2016 AY_{121}	—	November 6, 2010	Mount Lemmon	Mount Lemmon Survey	·	1.4 km	MPC · JPL
562642	2016 AS_{124}	—	January 8, 2016	Haleakala	Pan-STARRS 1	DOR	1.7 km	MPC · JPL
562643	2016 AR_{125}	—	March 13, 2012	Mount Lemmon	Mount Lemmon Survey	·	1.3 km	MPC · JPL
562644	2016 AP_{127}	—	December 26, 2009	Kitt Peak	Spacewatch	·	3.4 km	MPC · JPL
562645	2016 AU_{127}	—	November 21, 2006	Mount Lemmon	Mount Lemmon Survey	·	1.9 km	MPC · JPL
562646	2016 AZ_{127}	—	April 20, 2006	Mount Lemmon	Mount Lemmon Survey	·	3.4 km	MPC · JPL
562647	2016 AM_{128}	—	February 25, 2011	Kitt Peak	Spacewatch	·	2.4 km	MPC · JPL
562648	2016 AN_{128}	—	November 15, 2010	Mount Lemmon	Mount Lemmon Survey	·	2.0 km	MPC · JPL
562649	2016 AZ_{128}	—	September 29, 2013	Haleakala	Pan-STARRS 1	·	3.2 km	MPC · JPL
562650	2016 AY_{129}	—	March 29, 2000	Socorro	LINEAR	·	2.4 km	MPC · JPL
562651	2016 AH_{130}	—	October 8, 2008	Mount Lemmon	Mount Lemmon Survey	·	2.6 km	MPC · JPL
562652	2016 AL_{130}	—	March 2, 2008	Mount Lemmon	Mount Lemmon Survey	·	1.3 km	MPC · JPL
562653	2016 AS_{131}	—	January 19, 2012	Catalina	CSS	·	1.2 km	MPC · JPL
562654	2016 AW_{131}	—	December 18, 2007	Mount Lemmon	Mount Lemmon Survey	·	1.0 km	MPC · JPL
562655	2016 AN_{136}	—	November 8, 2010	Mount Lemmon	Mount Lemmon Survey	·	1.3 km	MPC · JPL
562656	2016 AS_{136}	—	February 8, 2007	Palomar	NEAT	GAL	1.6 km	MPC · JPL
562657	2016 AC_{137}	—	January 2, 2012	Mount Lemmon	Mount Lemmon Survey	·	930 m	MPC · JPL
562658	2016 AV_{138}	—	April 25, 2003	Kitt Peak	Spacewatch	·	1.8 km	MPC · JPL
562659	2016 AZ_{139}	—	September 6, 2014	Mount Lemmon	Mount Lemmon Survey	·	2.0 km	MPC · JPL
562660	2016 AR_{140}	—	October 17, 2014	Mount Lemmon	Mount Lemmon Survey	·	2.3 km	MPC · JPL
562661	2016 AP_{141}	—	November 22, 2005	Kitt Peak	Spacewatch	·	1.8 km	MPC · JPL
562662	2016 AT_{141}	—	January 9, 2016	Haleakala	Pan-STARRS 1	ADE	1.8 km	MPC · JPL
562663	2016 AH_{142}	—	February 17, 2007	Mount Lemmon	Mount Lemmon Survey	·	1.6 km	MPC · JPL
562664	2016 AJ_{142}	—	February 22, 2007	Kitt Peak	Spacewatch	·	1.6 km	MPC · JPL
562665	2016 AQ_{142}	—	December 6, 2015	Haleakala	Pan-STARRS 1	·	2.0 km	MPC · JPL
562666	2016 AW_{142}	—	September 19, 2014	Haleakala	Pan-STARRS 1	·	1.8 km	MPC · JPL
562667	2016 AR_{143}	—	September 18, 2014	Haleakala	Pan-STARRS 1	·	1.1 km	MPC · JPL
562668	2016 AU_{143}	—	October 17, 2010	Mount Lemmon	Mount Lemmon Survey	·	1.5 km	MPC · JPL
562669	2016 AX_{143}	—	May 17, 2009	Mount Lemmon	Mount Lemmon Survey	EUN	1.2 km	MPC · JPL
562670	2016 AN_{144}	—	August 29, 2014	Mount Lemmon	Mount Lemmon Survey	·	2.0 km	MPC · JPL
562671	2016 AF_{145}	—	April 15, 2008	Kitt Peak	Spacewatch	·	1.1 km	MPC · JPL
562672	2016 AU_{145}	—	April 7, 2008	Kitt Peak	Spacewatch	·	1.6 km	MPC · JPL
562673	2016 AV_{145}	—	November 16, 2010	Mount Lemmon	Mount Lemmon Survey	·	1.7 km	MPC · JPL
562674	2016 AF_{146}	—	February 10, 2007	Mount Lemmon	Mount Lemmon Survey	·	1.9 km	MPC · JPL
562675	2016 AJ_{148}	—	January 10, 2002	Cima Ekar	ADAS	·	2.0 km	MPC · JPL
562676	2016 AS_{149}	—	September 9, 2010	La Sagra	OAM	·	1.1 km	MPC · JPL
562677	2016 AZ_{152}	—	January 25, 2012	Haleakala	Pan-STARRS 1	·	1.5 km	MPC · JPL
562678	2016 AX_{153}	—	March 6, 2008	Mount Lemmon	Mount Lemmon Survey	MAR	890 m	MPC · JPL
562679	2016 AZ_{154}	—	April 14, 2008	Kitt Peak	Spacewatch	·	1.2 km	MPC · JPL
562680	2016 AE_{155}	—	April 6, 2008	Catalina	CSS	·	1.9 km	MPC · JPL
562681	2016 AM_{155}	—	April 28, 2008	Mount Lemmon	Mount Lemmon Survey	·	1.8 km	MPC · JPL
562682	2016 AU_{159}	—	October 29, 2010	Kitt Peak	Spacewatch	EUN	840 m	MPC · JPL
562683	2016 AG_{160}	—	November 4, 2010	Mount Lemmon	Mount Lemmon Survey	EUN	1.3 km	MPC · JPL
562684	2016 AX_{160}	—	January 11, 2016	Haleakala	Pan-STARRS 1	·	1.4 km	MPC · JPL
562685	2016 AY_{160}	—	April 18, 2012	Mount Lemmon	Mount Lemmon Survey	·	1.5 km	MPC · JPL
562686	2016 AK_{163}	—	September 20, 2009	Kitt Peak	Spacewatch	JUN	1.1 km	MPC · JPL
562687	2016 AO_{166}	—	August 22, 2014	Haleakala	Pan-STARRS 1	BRA	1.5 km	MPC · JPL
562688	2016 AA_{167}	—	February 2, 2008	Mount Lemmon	Mount Lemmon Survey	(194)	1.4 km	MPC · JPL
562689	2016 AS_{168}	—	November 7, 2010	Mount Lemmon	Mount Lemmon Survey	·	2.0 km	MPC · JPL
562690	2016 AX_{168}	—	June 7, 2013	Nogales	M. Schwartz, P. R. Holvorcem	·	1.9 km	MPC · JPL
562691	2016 AW_{169}	—	November 14, 2010	Mount Lemmon	Mount Lemmon Survey	·	1.9 km	MPC · JPL
562692	2016 AK_{171}	—	October 6, 2002	Anderson Mesa	LONEOS	·	1.3 km	MPC · JPL
562693	2016 AU_{171}	—	November 11, 2004	Catalina	CSS	PHO	1.0 km	MPC · JPL
562694	2016 AZ_{171}	—	December 31, 2015	Kitt Peak	Spacewatch	·	1.3 km	MPC · JPL
562695	2016 AW_{172}	—	September 29, 2003	Anderson Mesa	LONEOS	·	1.7 km	MPC · JPL
562696	2016 AZ_{172}	—	January 3, 2016	Haleakala	Pan-STARRS 1	·	1.5 km	MPC · JPL
562697	2016 AC_{173}	—	February 2, 2003	Palomar	NEAT	HNS	1.4 km	MPC · JPL
562698	2016 AM_{174}	—	January 19, 2012	Haleakala	Pan-STARRS 1	MAR	790 m	MPC · JPL
562699	2016 AR_{174}	—	June 18, 2013	Haleakala	Pan-STARRS 1	·	2.3 km	MPC · JPL
562700	2016 AX_{174}	—	April 22, 2012	Mount Lemmon	Mount Lemmon Survey	·	2.8 km	MPC · JPL

== 562701–562800 ==
back to top

Designation			Discovery			Properties		Ref
Permanent	Provisional	Named after	Date	Site	Discoverer(s)	Category	Diam.	Ref
562701	2016 AP_{175}	—	May 3, 2013	Mount Lemmon	Mount Lemmon Survey	·	1.8 km	MPC · JPL
562702	2016 AX_{175}	—	August 27, 2014	Haleakala	Pan-STARRS 1	·	1.5 km	MPC · JPL
562703	2016 AB_{176}	—	April 15, 2012	Haleakala	Pan-STARRS 1	·	1.3 km	MPC · JPL
562704	2016 AK_{176}	—	January 11, 2016	Haleakala	Pan-STARRS 1	GEF	1.0 km	MPC · JPL
562705	2016 AD_{177}	—	October 1, 2005	Kitt Peak	Spacewatch	WAT	1.1 km	MPC · JPL
562706	2016 AM_{177}	—	September 18, 2010	Mount Lemmon	Mount Lemmon Survey	·	1.1 km	MPC · JPL
562707	2016 AB_{178}	—	October 3, 2014	Mount Lemmon	Mount Lemmon Survey	·	1.6 km	MPC · JPL
562708	2016 AO_{179}	—	March 18, 2007	Kitt Peak	Spacewatch	·	1.8 km	MPC · JPL
562709	2016 AB_{180}	—	June 16, 2012	Haleakala	Pan-STARRS 1	·	3.1 km	MPC · JPL
562710	2016 AH_{180}	—	October 8, 2008	Mount Lemmon	Mount Lemmon Survey	EOS	1.6 km	MPC · JPL
562711	2016 AW_{180}	—	October 27, 2005	Kitt Peak	Spacewatch	DOR	1.9 km	MPC · JPL
562712	2016 AT_{181}	—	March 25, 2012	Mount Lemmon	Mount Lemmon Survey	·	1.7 km	MPC · JPL
562713	2016 AV_{181}	—	October 9, 2008	Mount Lemmon	Mount Lemmon Survey	·	2.1 km	MPC · JPL
562714	2016 AP_{182}	—	December 13, 2015	Haleakala	Pan-STARRS 1	·	3.0 km	MPC · JPL
562715	2016 AE_{183}	—	September 13, 2013	Mount Lemmon	Mount Lemmon Survey	EOS	1.8 km	MPC · JPL
562716	2016 AL_{183}	—	November 25, 2014	Mount Lemmon	Mount Lemmon Survey	·	1.9 km	MPC · JPL
562717	2016 AB_{184}	—	July 30, 2009	Kitt Peak	Spacewatch	·	1.9 km	MPC · JPL
562718	2016 AZ_{184}	—	November 16, 2006	Mount Lemmon	Mount Lemmon Survey	·	1.9 km	MPC · JPL
562719	2016 AA_{185}	—	December 6, 2015	Mount Lemmon	Mount Lemmon Survey	·	2.1 km	MPC · JPL
562720	2016 AG_{185}	—	December 3, 2010	Catalina	CSS	BRA	1.9 km	MPC · JPL
562721	2016 AL_{185}	—	February 23, 2012	Mount Lemmon	Mount Lemmon Survey	·	1.7 km	MPC · JPL
562722	2016 AV_{185}	—	December 5, 2010	Kitt Peak	Spacewatch	·	2.0 km	MPC · JPL
562723	2016 AD_{186}	—	November 20, 2009	Kitt Peak	Spacewatch	EOS	1.6 km	MPC · JPL
562724	2016 AY_{186}	—	February 4, 2012	Haleakala	Pan-STARRS 1	·	1.5 km	MPC · JPL
562725	2016 AE_{187}	—	June 5, 2013	Mount Lemmon	Mount Lemmon Survey	·	1.6 km	MPC · JPL
562726	2016 AK_{187}	—	March 11, 2008	Catalina	CSS	EUN	1.3 km	MPC · JPL
562727	2016 AO_{187}	—	August 9, 2013	Haleakala	Pan-STARRS 1	·	1.7 km	MPC · JPL
562728	2016 AZ_{187}	—	June 15, 2009	Mount Lemmon	Mount Lemmon Survey	·	1.7 km	MPC · JPL
562729	2016 AA_{188}	—	April 18, 2013	Mount Lemmon	Mount Lemmon Survey	·	2.0 km	MPC · JPL
562730	2016 AB_{188}	—	January 17, 2007	Kitt Peak	Spacewatch	·	1.2 km	MPC · JPL
562731	2016 AC_{188}	—	August 25, 2014	Haleakala	Pan-STARRS 1	HNS	830 m	MPC · JPL
562732	2016 AM_{188}	—	June 23, 2011	Mount Lemmon	Mount Lemmon Survey	·	760 m	MPC · JPL
562733	2016 AP_{188}	—	November 18, 2011	Mount Lemmon	Mount Lemmon Survey	EUN	1.2 km	MPC · JPL
562734	2016 AY_{188}	—	August 22, 2014	Haleakala	Pan-STARRS 1	·	990 m	MPC · JPL
562735	2016 AM_{190}	—	June 30, 2014	Haleakala	Pan-STARRS 1	·	1.2 km	MPC · JPL
562736	2016 AV_{191}	—	January 10, 2007	Kitt Peak	Spacewatch	·	1.4 km	MPC · JPL
562737	2016 AY_{191}	—	April 29, 2012	Kitt Peak	Spacewatch	·	1.8 km	MPC · JPL
562738	2016 AB_{194}	—	January 17, 2004	Haleakala	NEAT	·	1.7 km	MPC · JPL
562739	2016 AU_{200}	—	January 22, 2012	Haleakala	Pan-STARRS 1	·	1.2 km	MPC · JPL
562740	2016 AG_{207}	—	December 26, 2011	Mount Lemmon	Mount Lemmon Survey	·	1.0 km	MPC · JPL
562741	2016 AM_{208}	—	January 8, 2016	Haleakala	Pan-STARRS 1	·	550 m	MPC · JPL
562742	2016 AP_{211}	—	January 11, 2016	Haleakala	Pan-STARRS 1	·	890 m	MPC · JPL
562743	2016 AZ_{215}	—	July 27, 2001	Anderson Mesa	LONEOS	EUN	1.3 km	MPC · JPL
562744	2016 AB_{216}	—	August 25, 2014	Haleakala	Pan-STARRS 1	·	1.5 km	MPC · JPL
562745	2016 AP_{217}	—	February 12, 2000	Apache Point	SDSS	·	2.1 km	MPC · JPL
562746	2016 AU_{217}	—	December 18, 2004	Mount Lemmon	Mount Lemmon Survey	·	1.9 km	MPC · JPL
562747	2016 AG_{218}	—	March 1, 2012	Mount Lemmon	Mount Lemmon Survey	·	1.4 km	MPC · JPL
562748	2016 AH_{218}	—	December 4, 2010	Mount Lemmon	Mount Lemmon Survey	·	1.6 km	MPC · JPL
562749	2016 AL_{218}	—	March 13, 2012	Mount Lemmon	Mount Lemmon Survey	·	1.6 km	MPC · JPL
562750	2016 AN_{218}	—	March 12, 2008	Kitt Peak	Spacewatch	·	1.2 km	MPC · JPL
562751	2016 AP_{218}	—	October 14, 2010	Mount Lemmon	Mount Lemmon Survey	·	1.5 km	MPC · JPL
562752	2016 AS_{218}	—	October 22, 2005	Kitt Peak	Spacewatch	PAD	1.3 km	MPC · JPL
562753	2016 AT_{218}	—	December 14, 2010	Mount Lemmon	Mount Lemmon Survey	·	1.8 km	MPC · JPL
562754	2016 AV_{218}	—	August 27, 2009	Kitt Peak	Spacewatch	·	1.4 km	MPC · JPL
562755	2016 AX_{218}	—	September 18, 2010	Mount Lemmon	Mount Lemmon Survey	·	1.0 km	MPC · JPL
562756	2016 AY_{218}	—	March 28, 2012	Kitt Peak	Spacewatch	·	1.5 km	MPC · JPL
562757	2016 AZ_{218}	—	January 30, 2011	Mount Lemmon	Mount Lemmon Survey	·	1.9 km	MPC · JPL
562758	2016 AC_{219}	—	October 7, 2005	Mount Lemmon	Mount Lemmon Survey	·	1.5 km	MPC · JPL
562759	2016 AH_{219}	—	November 16, 2014	Mount Lemmon	Mount Lemmon Survey	AGN	1.1 km	MPC · JPL
562760	2016 AL_{219}	—	January 27, 2007	Mount Lemmon	Mount Lemmon Survey	·	1.4 km	MPC · JPL
562761	2016 AR_{220}	—	September 2, 2014	Haleakala	Pan-STARRS 1	·	1.2 km	MPC · JPL
562762	2016 AS_{220}	—	February 23, 2012	Mount Lemmon	Mount Lemmon Survey	·	1.0 km	MPC · JPL
562763	2016 AU_{220}	—	February 10, 2007	Mount Lemmon	Mount Lemmon Survey	·	1.5 km	MPC · JPL
562764	2016 AV_{220}	—	February 9, 2008	Mount Lemmon	Mount Lemmon Survey	(5)	850 m	MPC · JPL
562765	2016 AY_{220}	—	April 4, 2008	Kitt Peak	Spacewatch	·	1.3 km	MPC · JPL
562766	2016 AA_{221}	—	September 28, 2006	Mount Lemmon	Mount Lemmon Survey	·	1.4 km	MPC · JPL
562767	2016 AB_{221}	—	October 3, 2006	Mount Lemmon	Mount Lemmon Survey	·	980 m	MPC · JPL
562768	2016 AP_{221}	—	January 27, 2007	Mount Lemmon	Mount Lemmon Survey	·	1.3 km	MPC · JPL
562769	2016 AQ_{221}	—	January 24, 2007	Kitt Peak	Spacewatch	ADE	1.7 km	MPC · JPL
562770	2016 AS_{221}	—	August 29, 2009	Kitt Peak	Spacewatch	·	1.5 km	MPC · JPL
562771	2016 AV_{221}	—	March 20, 2007	Mount Lemmon	Mount Lemmon Survey	AGN	990 m	MPC · JPL
562772	2016 AA_{222}	—	February 9, 2007	Kitt Peak	Spacewatch	·	1.3 km	MPC · JPL
562773	2016 AD_{222}	—	January 9, 2016	Haleakala	Pan-STARRS 1	·	1.6 km	MPC · JPL
562774	2016 AL_{222}	—	March 31, 2008	Mount Lemmon	Mount Lemmon Survey	·	1.1 km	MPC · JPL
562775	2016 AM_{222}	—	November 10, 2010	Dauban	C. Rinner, Kugel, F.	·	1.3 km	MPC · JPL
562776	2016 AP_{222}	—	August 20, 2014	Haleakala	Pan-STARRS 1	·	1.1 km	MPC · JPL
562777	2016 AV_{222}	—	January 24, 2007	Mount Lemmon	Mount Lemmon Survey	·	1.3 km	MPC · JPL
562778	2016 AM_{223}	—	March 25, 2007	Mount Lemmon	Mount Lemmon Survey	·	1.8 km	MPC · JPL
562779	2016 AG_{224}	—	March 8, 2005	Mount Lemmon	Mount Lemmon Survey	·	3.4 km	MPC · JPL
562780	2016 AH_{224}	—	April 20, 1993	Kitt Peak	Spacewatch	·	1.8 km	MPC · JPL
562781	2016 AK_{224}	—	April 2, 2005	Mount Lemmon	Mount Lemmon Survey	·	2.6 km	MPC · JPL
562782	2016 AX_{224}	—	January 19, 2012	Haleakala	Pan-STARRS 1	·	1.4 km	MPC · JPL
562783	2016 AY_{224}	—	October 12, 2010	Mount Lemmon	Mount Lemmon Survey	·	1.2 km	MPC · JPL
562784	2016 AA_{225}	—	December 31, 2007	Kitt Peak	Spacewatch	(5)	910 m	MPC · JPL
562785	2016 AF_{225}	—	April 4, 2008	Mount Lemmon	Mount Lemmon Survey	·	1.5 km	MPC · JPL
562786	2016 AG_{225}	—	November 27, 2006	Mount Lemmon	Mount Lemmon Survey	·	1.8 km	MPC · JPL
562787	2016 AH_{225}	—	November 27, 2010	Mount Lemmon	Mount Lemmon Survey	·	1.1 km	MPC · JPL
562788	2016 AJ_{225}	—	December 3, 2010	Mount Lemmon	Mount Lemmon Survey	·	1.3 km	MPC · JPL
562789	2016 AK_{225}	—	October 28, 2010	Mount Lemmon	Mount Lemmon Survey	·	1.2 km	MPC · JPL
562790	2016 AM_{225}	—	April 7, 2008	Catalina	CSS	·	1.9 km	MPC · JPL
562791	2016 AQ_{225}	—	April 3, 2008	Mount Lemmon	Mount Lemmon Survey	·	1.3 km	MPC · JPL
562792	2016 AS_{225}	—	January 11, 2008	Mount Lemmon	Mount Lemmon Survey	·	1.6 km	MPC · JPL
562793	2016 AU_{225}	—	January 4, 2016	Haleakala	Pan-STARRS 1	·	1.2 km	MPC · JPL
562794	2016 AV_{225}	—	January 26, 2012	Mount Lemmon	Mount Lemmon Survey	MAR	810 m	MPC · JPL
562795	2016 AC_{226}	—	March 29, 2008	Mount Lemmon	Mount Lemmon Survey	MAR	940 m	MPC · JPL
562796	2016 AG_{226}	—	October 1, 2010	Mount Lemmon	Mount Lemmon Survey	·	770 m	MPC · JPL
562797	2016 AL_{226}	—	January 7, 2016	Haleakala	Pan-STARRS 1	·	1.4 km	MPC · JPL
562798	2016 AW_{226}	—	November 5, 1996	Kitt Peak	Spacewatch	·	1.8 km	MPC · JPL
562799	2016 AX_{226}	—	September 17, 2010	Mount Lemmon	Mount Lemmon Survey	·	1.6 km	MPC · JPL
562800	2016 AB_{227}	—	May 11, 2008	Mount Lemmon	Mount Lemmon Survey	·	1.7 km	MPC · JPL

== 562801–562900 ==
back to top

Designation			Discovery			Properties		Ref
Permanent	Provisional	Named after	Date	Site	Discoverer(s)	Category	Diam.	Ref
562801	2016 AG_{227}	—	August 28, 2014	Haleakala	Pan-STARRS 1	·	960 m	MPC · JPL
562802	2016 AP_{227}	—	February 28, 2008	Mount Lemmon	Mount Lemmon Survey	·	750 m	MPC · JPL
562803	2016 AQ_{227}	—	April 13, 2008	Mount Lemmon	Mount Lemmon Survey	·	1.1 km	MPC · JPL
562804	2016 AA_{229}	—	April 28, 2011	Kitt Peak	Spacewatch	·	3.2 km	MPC · JPL
562805	2016 AC_{229}	—	November 22, 2014	Haleakala	Pan-STARRS 1	·	2.9 km	MPC · JPL
562806	2016 AN_{229}	—	January 9, 2016	Haleakala	Pan-STARRS 1	·	2.9 km	MPC · JPL
562807	2016 AO_{231}	—	January 4, 2016	Haleakala	Pan-STARRS 1	·	1.3 km	MPC · JPL
562808	2016 AA_{232}	—	August 8, 2013	Kitt Peak	Spacewatch	(194)	1.7 km	MPC · JPL
562809	2016 AL_{232}	—	January 4, 2016	Haleakala	Pan-STARRS 1	·	1.6 km	MPC · JPL
562810	2016 AX_{232}	—	January 4, 2011	Mount Lemmon	Mount Lemmon Survey	·	1.5 km	MPC · JPL
562811	2016 AC_{233}	—	March 17, 2012	Mount Lemmon	Mount Lemmon Survey	·	2.0 km	MPC · JPL
562812	2016 AV_{233}	—	March 15, 2012	Mount Lemmon	Mount Lemmon Survey	·	1.3 km	MPC · JPL
562813	2016 AW_{233}	—	October 23, 2009	Mount Lemmon	Mount Lemmon Survey	·	1.7 km	MPC · JPL
562814	2016 AY_{234}	—	November 26, 2014	Haleakala	Pan-STARRS 1	·	2.5 km	MPC · JPL
562815	2016 AJ_{235}	—	April 3, 2008	Kitt Peak	Spacewatch	·	1.0 km	MPC · JPL
562816	2016 AK_{235}	—	July 15, 2013	Haleakala	Pan-STARRS 1	·	1.6 km	MPC · JPL
562817	2016 AN_{236}	—	November 8, 2010	Kitt Peak	Spacewatch	·	1.5 km	MPC · JPL
562818	2016 AY_{236}	—	December 8, 2010	Mount Lemmon	Mount Lemmon Survey	BRA	1.5 km	MPC · JPL
562819	2016 AD_{237}	—	October 28, 2014	Haleakala	Pan-STARRS 1	·	1.9 km	MPC · JPL
562820	2016 AF_{237}	—	November 22, 2009	Kitt Peak	Spacewatch	·	2.3 km	MPC · JPL
562821	2016 AG_{237}	—	November 21, 2009	Mount Lemmon	Mount Lemmon Survey	EOS	2.4 km	MPC · JPL
562822	2016 AK_{237}	—	August 26, 2013	Haleakala	Pan-STARRS 1	NAE	2.1 km	MPC · JPL
562823	2016 AN_{237}	—	September 16, 2003	Kitt Peak	Spacewatch	·	1.9 km	MPC · JPL
562824	2016 AS_{237}	—	December 26, 2014	Haleakala	Pan-STARRS 1	·	2.3 km	MPC · JPL
562825	2016 AT_{237}	—	April 12, 2011	Mount Lemmon	Mount Lemmon Survey	·	2.0 km	MPC · JPL
562826	2016 AU_{238}	—	January 1, 2016	Haleakala	Pan-STARRS 1	·	1.7 km	MPC · JPL
562827	2016 AO_{239}	—	November 4, 2010	Mount Lemmon	Mount Lemmon Survey	·	1.4 km	MPC · JPL
562828	2016 AT_{239}	—	January 2, 2016	Haleakala	Pan-STARRS 1	·	1.1 km	MPC · JPL
562829	2016 AW_{239}	—	December 20, 2006	Mount Lemmon	Mount Lemmon Survey	·	2.2 km	MPC · JPL
562830	2016 AE_{240}	—	October 31, 2010	Mount Lemmon	Mount Lemmon Survey	·	1.1 km	MPC · JPL
562831	2016 AG_{240}	—	January 17, 2007	Kitt Peak	Spacewatch	·	2.1 km	MPC · JPL
562832	2016 AV_{240}	—	March 6, 2008	Catalina	CSS	EUN	1.2 km	MPC · JPL
562833	2016 AW_{240}	—	June 18, 2013	Haleakala	Pan-STARRS 1	·	1.8 km	MPC · JPL
562834	2016 AX_{240}	—	November 11, 2006	Mount Lemmon	Mount Lemmon Survey	·	1.2 km	MPC · JPL
562835	2016 AE_{241}	—	December 24, 2006	Kitt Peak	Spacewatch	·	1.9 km	MPC · JPL
562836	2016 AW_{241}	—	January 3, 2016	Haleakala	Pan-STARRS 1	·	2.1 km	MPC · JPL
562837	2016 AK_{242}	—	January 3, 2016	Haleakala	Pan-STARRS 1	KOR	1.1 km	MPC · JPL
562838	2016 AN_{242}	—	December 12, 2006	Kitt Peak	Spacewatch	·	1.6 km	MPC · JPL
562839	2016 AL_{243}	—	March 11, 2008	Kitt Peak	Spacewatch	·	1.2 km	MPC · JPL
562840	2016 AW_{243}	—	March 23, 2003	Apache Point	SDSS Collaboration	·	1.1 km	MPC · JPL
562841	2016 AA_{244}	—	August 28, 2014	Haleakala	Pan-STARRS 1	·	1.4 km	MPC · JPL
562842	2016 AP_{244}	—	July 29, 2009	Kitt Peak	Spacewatch	EUN	1.2 km	MPC · JPL
562843	2016 AQ_{244}	—	November 13, 2010	Mount Lemmon	Mount Lemmon Survey	·	1.4 km	MPC · JPL
562844	2016 AV_{244}	—	November 16, 2010	Mount Lemmon	Mount Lemmon Survey	·	1.5 km	MPC · JPL
562845	2016 AY_{244}	—	January 18, 2008	Kitt Peak	Spacewatch	·	800 m	MPC · JPL
562846	2016 AB_{245}	—	July 4, 2005	Palomar	NEAT	EUN	1.2 km	MPC · JPL
562847	2016 AC_{245}	—	January 10, 2007	Kitt Peak	Spacewatch	·	1.4 km	MPC · JPL
562848	2016 AD_{245}	—	October 27, 2005	Kitt Peak	Spacewatch	AGN	1.0 km	MPC · JPL
562849	2016 AT_{245}	—	January 22, 2012	Haleakala	Pan-STARRS 1	(194)	1.2 km	MPC · JPL
562850	2016 AJ_{246}	—	January 3, 2016	Haleakala	Pan-STARRS 1	·	1.2 km	MPC · JPL
562851	2016 AR_{246}	—	October 26, 2014	Cala d'Hort	I. de la Cueva, J. L. Ferrer	·	2.0 km	MPC · JPL
562852	2016 AF_{247}	—	August 20, 2014	Haleakala	Pan-STARRS 1	·	830 m	MPC · JPL
562853	2016 AJ_{248}	—	January 4, 2016	Haleakala	Pan-STARRS 1	·	1.3 km	MPC · JPL
562854	2016 AY_{248}	—	December 2, 2010	Mount Lemmon	Mount Lemmon Survey	·	1.5 km	MPC · JPL
562855	2016 AJ_{249}	—	January 4, 2016	Haleakala	Pan-STARRS 1	·	1.7 km	MPC · JPL
562856	2016 AX_{249}	—	December 28, 2011	Mount Lemmon	Mount Lemmon Survey	(5)	1.2 km	MPC · JPL
562857	2016 AO_{250}	—	November 3, 2010	Mount Lemmon	Mount Lemmon Survey	·	1.4 km	MPC · JPL
562858	2016 AW_{250}	—	July 31, 2014	Haleakala	Pan-STARRS 1	·	1.3 km	MPC · JPL
562859	2016 AB_{251}	—	September 20, 2014	Haleakala	Pan-STARRS 1	·	1.6 km	MPC · JPL
562860	2016 AG_{251}	—	October 29, 2010	Mount Lemmon	Mount Lemmon Survey	·	1.1 km	MPC · JPL
562861	2016 AK_{251}	—	October 11, 2010	Mount Lemmon	Mount Lemmon Survey	·	1.1 km	MPC · JPL
562862	2016 AT_{251}	—	January 4, 2016	Haleakala	Pan-STARRS 1	·	1.6 km	MPC · JPL
562863	2016 AV_{251}	—	January 4, 2016	Haleakala	Pan-STARRS 1	·	1.5 km	MPC · JPL
562864	2016 AE_{253}	—	August 30, 2014	Haleakala	Pan-STARRS 1	·	800 m	MPC · JPL
562865	2016 AM_{253}	—	January 28, 2011	Mount Lemmon	Mount Lemmon Survey	·	1.6 km	MPC · JPL
562866	2016 AQ_{253}	—	October 26, 2005	Kitt Peak	Spacewatch	AGN	860 m	MPC · JPL
562867	2016 AE_{255}	—	January 7, 2016	Haleakala	Pan-STARRS 1	·	1.2 km	MPC · JPL
562868	2016 AJ_{255}	—	September 13, 2005	Kitt Peak	Spacewatch	·	1.4 km	MPC · JPL
562869	2016 AD_{256}	—	January 28, 2007	Kitt Peak	Spacewatch	GEF	920 m	MPC · JPL
562870	2016 AT_{256}	—	July 25, 2014	Haleakala	Pan-STARRS 1	·	910 m	MPC · JPL
562871	2016 AW_{256}	—	July 16, 2004	Cerro Tololo	Deep Ecliptic Survey	AGN	1.1 km	MPC · JPL
562872	2016 AD_{257}	—	August 28, 2014	Haleakala	Pan-STARRS 1	·	810 m	MPC · JPL
562873	2016 AY_{257}	—	September 14, 2005	Kitt Peak	Spacewatch	WIT	750 m	MPC · JPL
562874	2016 AM_{258}	—	February 27, 2012	Haleakala	Pan-STARRS 1	·	1.9 km	MPC · JPL
562875	2016 AV_{258}	—	January 8, 2016	Haleakala	Pan-STARRS 1	·	1.3 km	MPC · JPL
562876	2016 AZ_{258}	—	September 19, 2014	Haleakala	Pan-STARRS 1	·	1.9 km	MPC · JPL
562877	2016 AB_{259}	—	December 31, 2007	Kitt Peak	Spacewatch	PHO	960 m	MPC · JPL
562878	2016 AQ_{259}	—	January 27, 2007	Mount Lemmon	Mount Lemmon Survey	·	1.5 km	MPC · JPL
562879	2016 AD_{260}	—	January 11, 2011	Kitt Peak	Spacewatch	·	1.4 km	MPC · JPL
562880	2016 AJ_{260}	—	January 10, 2011	Mount Lemmon	Mount Lemmon Survey	·	2.4 km	MPC · JPL
562881	2016 AO_{260}	—	January 27, 2007	Kitt Peak	Spacewatch	·	1.6 km	MPC · JPL
562882	2016 AR_{260}	—	August 12, 2013	Haleakala	Pan-STARRS 1	·	1.7 km	MPC · JPL
562883	2016 AA_{261}	—	November 22, 2014	Haleakala	Pan-STARRS 1	·	1.6 km	MPC · JPL
562884	2016 AD_{261}	—	April 25, 2007	Kitt Peak	Spacewatch	·	2.1 km	MPC · JPL
562885	2016 AG_{261}	—	November 29, 2014	Mount Lemmon	Mount Lemmon Survey	EOS	1.9 km	MPC · JPL
562886	2016 AT_{261}	—	January 30, 2011	Haleakala	Pan-STARRS 1	BRA	1.4 km	MPC · JPL
562887	2016 AH_{264}	—	August 27, 2014	Haleakala	Pan-STARRS 1	·	1.2 km	MPC · JPL
562888	2016 AN_{264}	—	September 22, 2009	Kitt Peak	Spacewatch	AGN	1.1 km	MPC · JPL
562889	2016 AS_{264}	—	November 16, 2006	Kitt Peak	Spacewatch	MIS	2.1 km	MPC · JPL
562890	2016 AX_{264}	—	January 27, 2007	Kitt Peak	Spacewatch	·	1.7 km	MPC · JPL
562891	2016 AC_{265}	—	January 22, 2002	Kitt Peak	Spacewatch	·	1.6 km	MPC · JPL
562892	2016 AE_{265}	—	October 29, 2014	Haleakala	Pan-STARRS 1	·	1.6 km	MPC · JPL
562893	2016 AN_{265}	—	January 30, 2011	Mount Lemmon	Mount Lemmon Survey	·	2.1 km	MPC · JPL
562894	2016 AT_{265}	—	January 9, 2016	Haleakala	Pan-STARRS 1	BRA	1.7 km	MPC · JPL
562895	2016 AC_{266}	—	November 17, 2008	Kitt Peak	Spacewatch	·	3.1 km	MPC · JPL
562896	2016 AJ_{266}	—	January 9, 2016	Haleakala	Pan-STARRS 1	·	1.7 km	MPC · JPL
562897	2016 AM_{266}	—	January 9, 2016	Haleakala	Pan-STARRS 1	JUN	950 m	MPC · JPL
562898	2016 AO_{266}	—	August 18, 2001	Palomar	NEAT	·	4.2 km	MPC · JPL
562899	2016 AD_{268}	—	November 1, 2010	Mount Lemmon	Mount Lemmon Survey	EUN	930 m	MPC · JPL
562900	2016 AL_{268}	—	January 28, 2011	Mount Lemmon	Mount Lemmon Survey	·	1.5 km	MPC · JPL

== 562901–563000 ==
back to top

Designation			Discovery			Properties		Ref
Permanent	Provisional	Named after	Date	Site	Discoverer(s)	Category	Diam.	Ref
562901	2016 AV_{268}	—	July 7, 2014	Haleakala	Pan-STARRS 1	·	1.6 km	MPC · JPL
562902	2016 AP_{269}	—	October 22, 2014	Mount Lemmon	Mount Lemmon Survey	·	1.6 km	MPC · JPL
562903	2016 AQ_{269}	—	November 17, 2014	Haleakala	Pan-STARRS 1	·	1.8 km	MPC · JPL
562904	2016 AW_{269}	—	November 4, 2013	XuYi	PMO NEO Survey Program	·	3.3 km	MPC · JPL
562905	2016 AX_{269}	—	October 10, 2002	Palomar	NEAT	EOS	2.6 km	MPC · JPL
562906	2016 AC_{270}	—	January 22, 2012	Haleakala	Pan-STARRS 1	EUN	1.2 km	MPC · JPL
562907	2016 AE_{271}	—	September 28, 2001	Palomar	NEAT	·	1.6 km	MPC · JPL
562908	2016 AM_{271}	—	December 10, 2010	Mount Lemmon	Mount Lemmon Survey	·	1.7 km	MPC · JPL
562909	2016 AQ_{271}	—	December 9, 2015	ESA OGS	ESA OGS	·	1.3 km	MPC · JPL
562910	2016 AD_{273}	—	November 13, 2010	Mount Lemmon	Mount Lemmon Survey	·	1.1 km	MPC · JPL
562911	2016 AH_{274}	—	October 26, 2014	Mount Lemmon	Mount Lemmon Survey	·	1.3 km	MPC · JPL
562912	2016 AR_{274}	—	February 5, 2011	Haleakala	Pan-STARRS 1	·	1.7 km	MPC · JPL
562913	2016 AT_{274}	—	October 28, 2014	Mount Lemmon	Mount Lemmon Survey	·	1.8 km	MPC · JPL
562914	2016 AF_{275}	—	October 26, 2014	Mount Lemmon	Mount Lemmon Survey	·	1.7 km	MPC · JPL
562915	2016 AH_{275}	—	April 18, 2012	Mount Lemmon	Mount Lemmon Survey	NEM	1.9 km	MPC · JPL
562916	2016 AM_{276}	—	February 21, 2007	Kitt Peak	Spacewatch	·	1.3 km	MPC · JPL
562917	2016 AL_{277}	—	January 15, 2016	Haleakala	Pan-STARRS 1	·	1.3 km	MPC · JPL
562918	2016 AW_{277}	—	August 22, 2014	Haleakala	Pan-STARRS 1	KON	1.8 km	MPC · JPL
562919	2016 AY_{277}	—	August 27, 2009	Kitt Peak	Spacewatch	·	1.7 km	MPC · JPL
562920	2016 AD_{278}	—	January 3, 2016	Haleakala	Pan-STARRS 1	·	1.4 km	MPC · JPL
562921	2016 AJ_{278}	—	January 8, 2016	Haleakala	Pan-STARRS 1	·	1.3 km	MPC · JPL
562922	2016 AV_{279}	—	January 3, 2016	Haleakala	Pan-STARRS 1	·	1.2 km	MPC · JPL
562923	2016 AE_{280}	—	January 1, 2016	Mount Lemmon	Mount Lemmon Survey	·	1.6 km	MPC · JPL
562924	2016 AF_{281}	—	January 27, 2006	Kitt Peak	Spacewatch	H	390 m	MPC · JPL
562925	2016 AK_{285}	—	November 30, 2010	Mount Lemmon	Mount Lemmon Survey	·	1.6 km	MPC · JPL
562926	2016 AS_{291}	—	August 28, 2014	Haleakala	Pan-STARRS 1	·	1.4 km	MPC · JPL
562927	2016 AV_{301}	—	January 7, 2016	Haleakala	Pan-STARRS 1	·	1.2 km	MPC · JPL
562928	2016 AE_{302}	—	January 9, 2016	Haleakala	Pan-STARRS 1	·	2.3 km	MPC · JPL
562929	2016 AH_{306}	—	January 9, 2016	Haleakala	Pan-STARRS 1	·	1.5 km	MPC · JPL
562930	2016 AE_{307}	—	January 14, 2016	Mount Lemmon	Mount Lemmon Survey	HNS	810 m	MPC · JPL
562931	2016 AD_{313}	—	January 4, 2016	Haleakala	Pan-STARRS 1	AGN	900 m	MPC · JPL
562932	2016 AK_{315}	—	October 12, 2014	Mount Lemmon	Mount Lemmon Survey	·	2.2 km	MPC · JPL
562933	2016 AV_{322}	—	January 4, 2016	Haleakala	Pan-STARRS 1	AGN	990 m	MPC · JPL
562934	2016 AO_{326}	—	January 10, 2016	Haleakala	Pan-STARRS 1	·	3.0 km	MPC · JPL
562935	2016 BV_{1}	—	April 19, 2012	Mount Lemmon	Mount Lemmon Survey	·	1.7 km	MPC · JPL
562936 Bródyimre	2016 BG_{2}	Bródyimre	September 3, 2010	Piszkéstető	K. Sárneczky, Z. Kuli	·	980 m	MPC · JPL
562937	2016 BL_{2}	—	March 16, 2007	Kitt Peak	Spacewatch	·	1.6 km	MPC · JPL
562938	2016 BM_{2}	—	January 27, 2007	Mount Lemmon	Mount Lemmon Survey	·	1.4 km	MPC · JPL
562939	2016 BP_{2}	—	October 1, 2014	Haleakala	Pan-STARRS 1	GEF	1.2 km	MPC · JPL
562940	2016 BT_{3}	—	October 22, 2006	Mount Lemmon	Mount Lemmon Survey	·	2.5 km	MPC · JPL
562941	2016 BY_{3}	—	July 14, 2009	Kitt Peak	Spacewatch	·	2.3 km	MPC · JPL
562942	2016 BK_{4}	—	March 20, 2012	Haleakala	Pan-STARRS 1	EUN	960 m	MPC · JPL
562943	2016 BH_{6}	—	January 30, 2011	Haleakala	Pan-STARRS 1	·	1.8 km	MPC · JPL
562944	2016 BS_{7}	—	January 13, 2011	Kitt Peak	Spacewatch	GEF	910 m	MPC · JPL
562945	2016 BS_{8}	—	March 15, 2012	Haleakala	Pan-STARRS 1	·	1.2 km	MPC · JPL
562946	2016 BD_{10}	—	August 20, 2014	Haleakala	Pan-STARRS 1	·	1.2 km	MPC · JPL
562947	2016 BO_{14}	—	March 5, 1997	Kitt Peak	Spacewatch	·	360 m	MPC · JPL
562948	2016 BA_{16}	—	July 4, 2014	Haleakala	Pan-STARRS 1	EUN	1.1 km	MPC · JPL
562949	2016 BD_{16}	—	February 13, 2012	Haleakala	Pan-STARRS 1	HNS	960 m	MPC · JPL
562950	2016 BZ_{16}	—	November 8, 2010	Mount Lemmon	Mount Lemmon Survey	·	1.3 km	MPC · JPL
562951	2016 BN_{17}	—	December 4, 2010	Mount Lemmon	Mount Lemmon Survey	·	1.8 km	MPC · JPL
562952	2016 BT_{17}	—	December 28, 2005	Kitt Peak	Spacewatch	·	1.5 km	MPC · JPL
562953	2016 BA_{18}	—	February 26, 2012	Oukaïmeden	C. Rinner	EUN	1.2 km	MPC · JPL
562954	2016 BF_{18}	—	May 29, 2008	Kitt Peak	Spacewatch	·	1.8 km	MPC · JPL
562955	2016 BG_{18}	—	January 27, 2007	Mount Lemmon	Mount Lemmon Survey	·	1.2 km	MPC · JPL
562956	2016 BJ_{18}	—	February 23, 2007	Kitt Peak	Spacewatch	AGN	1.0 km	MPC · JPL
562957	2016 BT_{18}	—	September 14, 2007	Catalina	CSS	·	1.1 km	MPC · JPL
562958	2016 BH_{19}	—	March 14, 2012	Mount Lemmon	Mount Lemmon Survey	·	1.8 km	MPC · JPL
562959	2016 BP_{19}	—	February 26, 2012	Haleakala	Pan-STARRS 1	·	1.1 km	MPC · JPL
562960	2016 BR_{19}	—	February 27, 2012	Haleakala	Pan-STARRS 1	HOF	2.0 km	MPC · JPL
562961	2016 BY_{20}	—	October 2, 2014	Haleakala	Pan-STARRS 1	·	1.6 km	MPC · JPL
562962	2016 BY_{21}	—	March 26, 2008	Mount Lemmon	Mount Lemmon Survey	·	780 m	MPC · JPL
562963	2016 BK_{22}	—	January 29, 2007	Kitt Peak	Spacewatch	PAD	1.5 km	MPC · JPL
562964 Hudin	2016 BM_{22}	Hudin	June 3, 2014	La Palma	EURONEAR	GEF	1.2 km	MPC · JPL
562965	2016 BR_{22}	—	February 3, 2012	Haleakala	Pan-STARRS 1	·	950 m	MPC · JPL
562966	2016 BU_{22}	—	October 24, 2005	Kitt Peak	Spacewatch	·	1.6 km	MPC · JPL
562967	2016 BY_{22}	—	January 28, 2007	Kitt Peak	Spacewatch	·	2.1 km	MPC · JPL
562968	2016 BA_{23}	—	May 20, 2005	Mount Lemmon	Mount Lemmon Survey	·	910 m	MPC · JPL
562969	2016 BG_{23}	—	January 8, 2016	Haleakala	Pan-STARRS 1	·	1.2 km	MPC · JPL
562970	2016 BP_{23}	—	January 28, 2007	Mount Lemmon	Mount Lemmon Survey	·	2.0 km	MPC · JPL
562971 Johannhagen	2016 BG_{24}	Johannhagen	February 23, 2012	Mount Graham	K. Černis, R. P. Boyle	·	1.0 km	MPC · JPL
562972	2016 BO_{24}	—	February 28, 2008	Kitt Peak	Spacewatch	·	1.4 km	MPC · JPL
562973	2016 BA_{25}	—	July 13, 2013	Haleakala	Pan-STARRS 1	·	1.5 km	MPC · JPL
562974	2016 BS_{25}	—	December 20, 2001	Kitt Peak	Spacewatch	·	1.5 km	MPC · JPL
562975	2016 BW_{25}	—	May 11, 2008	Kitt Peak	Spacewatch	·	2.4 km	MPC · JPL
562976	2016 BT_{26}	—	February 29, 2008	Kitt Peak	Spacewatch	·	1.4 km	MPC · JPL
562977	2016 BC_{28}	—	December 13, 2006	Mount Lemmon	Mount Lemmon Survey	·	2.2 km	MPC · JPL
562978	2016 BK_{28}	—	August 28, 2014	Haleakala	Pan-STARRS 1	·	970 m	MPC · JPL
562979 Barabásmiklós	2016 BB_{29}	Barabásmiklós	September 3, 2010	Piszkéstető	K. Sárneczky, Z. Kuli	(5)	900 m	MPC · JPL
562980	2016 BB_{30}	—	July 25, 2014	Haleakala	Pan-STARRS 1	EUN	760 m	MPC · JPL
562981	2016 BB_{32}	—	October 28, 2005	Mount Lemmon	Mount Lemmon Survey	·	2.1 km	MPC · JPL
562982	2016 BR_{32}	—	March 29, 2012	Haleakala	Pan-STARRS 1	·	2.0 km	MPC · JPL
562983	2016 BB_{33}	—	October 1, 2014	Haleakala	Pan-STARRS 1	·	1.5 km	MPC · JPL
562984	2016 BP_{33}	—	August 9, 2005	Cerro Tololo	Deep Ecliptic Survey	·	1.2 km	MPC · JPL
562985	2016 BB_{35}	—	April 29, 2003	Kitt Peak	Spacewatch	·	2.1 km	MPC · JPL
562986	2016 BL_{35}	—	December 28, 2011	Les Engarouines	L. Bernasconi	·	1.6 km	MPC · JPL
562987	2016 BB_{37}	—	July 24, 1995	Kitt Peak	Spacewatch	·	2.4 km	MPC · JPL
562988	2016 BN_{40}	—	January 29, 2016	Mount Lemmon	Mount Lemmon Survey	·	1.4 km	MPC · JPL
562989	2016 BY_{41}	—	March 24, 2012	Mount Lemmon	Mount Lemmon Survey	·	1.2 km	MPC · JPL
562990	2016 BX_{42}	—	January 8, 2016	Haleakala	Pan-STARRS 1	·	1.8 km	MPC · JPL
562991	2016 BA_{44}	—	June 30, 2014	Haleakala	Pan-STARRS 1	·	1.9 km	MPC · JPL
562992	2016 BB_{44}	—	September 5, 2010	Mount Lemmon	Mount Lemmon Survey	·	890 m	MPC · JPL
562993	2016 BJ_{44}	—	October 27, 2006	Mount Lemmon	Mount Lemmon Survey	MIS	2.2 km	MPC · JPL
562994	2016 BP_{44}	—	January 12, 2008	Mount Lemmon	Mount Lemmon Survey	·	1.8 km	MPC · JPL
562995	2016 BU_{45}	—	August 27, 2014	Haleakala	Pan-STARRS 1	·	1.4 km	MPC · JPL
562996	2016 BS_{46}	—	January 29, 2012	Kitt Peak	Spacewatch	·	1.6 km	MPC · JPL
562997	2016 BH_{47}	—	October 25, 2014	Mount Lemmon	Mount Lemmon Survey	·	1.4 km	MPC · JPL
562998	2016 BN_{47}	—	December 2, 2010	Mount Lemmon	Mount Lemmon Survey	DOR	1.9 km	MPC · JPL
562999	2016 BW_{47}	—	September 20, 2014	Haleakala	Pan-STARRS 1	·	1.6 km	MPC · JPL
563000	2016 BB_{48}	—	June 7, 2013	Haleakala	Pan-STARRS 1	·	1.3 km	MPC · JPL

back to top

== Meaning of names ==
As minor planet discoveries are confirmed, they are given a permanent number by the IAU's Minor Planet Center (MPC), and the discoverers can then submit names for them, following the IAU's naming conventions. The list below concerns those minor planets in the specified number-range that have received names, and explains the meanings of those names.

Official naming citations of newly named small Solar System bodies are approved and published in a bulletin by IAU's Working Group for Small Bodies Nomenclature (WGSBN). Before May 2021, citations were published in MPC's Minor Planet Circulars for many decades. Recent citations can also be found on the JPL Small-Body Database (SBDB). Until his death in 2016, German astronomer Lutz D. Schmadel compiled these citations into the Dictionary of Minor Planet Names (DMP) and regularly updated the collection.

Based on Paul Herget's The Names of the Minor Planets, Schmadel also researched the unclear origin of numerous asteroids, most of which had been named prior to World War II. This article incorporates text from this source, which is in the public domain: SBDB New namings may only be added to this list below after official publication as the preannouncement of names is condemned. The WGSBN publishes a comprehensive guideline for the naming rules of non-cometary small Solar System bodies.

Named minor planet	Provisional	This minor planet was named for...	Ref · Catalog
562008 Samtackeff	2015 XW_{62}	Samantha “Sam" Tackeff (born 1986) is a North American entrepreneur and food connoisseur.	IAU · 562008
562237 Chentsov	2015 XV_{349}	Evgeny Chentsov (1937–2021), Russian astronomer, educator, and populariser.	IAU · 562237
562446 Pilinszky	2015 YR_{23}	János Pilinszky (1921–1981), a Hungarian poet, best known for his poems about the horrors of a prisoner of war and the life under a communist dictatorship.	IAU · 562446
562936 Bródyimre	2016 BG_{2}	Imre Bródy (1891–1944), a Hungarian physicist, inventor and developer of the modern krypton electric bulb.	IAU · 562936
562964 Hudin	2016 BM_{22}	Lucian Hudin (b. 1975) is a Romanian amateur astronomer and computer programmer who owns a small roll-off observatory in Cluj-Napoca. A very active member of the EURONEAR project using the Isaac Newton Telescope, he was involved in data reduction of near Earth asteroids, discovering seven such bodies and other minor planets.	IAU · 562964
562971 Johannhagen	2016 BG_{24}	Johann Georg Hagen (1847–1930), an Austrian-American astronomer and Jesuit priest. He helped devise several experiments that proved Copernicus and Galileo's theories.	IAU · 562971
562979 Barabásmiklós	2016 BB_{29}	Miklós Barabás (1810–1898) was a painter, graphic artist, photographer, and a corresponding member of the Hungarian Academy of Sciences. He was one of the most outstanding masters of Hungarian Biedermeier painting, and one of the earliest Hungarian photographers.	IAU · 562979
