= Ernő Winter =

Hungarian engineer

Ernő Winter (15 March 1897 – 2 June 1971) was a Hungarian engineer who developed barium lamps. Working at Tungsram, Ernő Winter, along with others, co-developed tungsten technology for the production of more reliable and longer-lasting coiled-filament lamps.

In 1923 at Tungsram Ltd., a research laboratory was established for improving light sources, mainly electric bulbs. The head of that laboratory was Ignác Pfeifer (1867–1941), whose research staff included Ernő Winter, along with Tivadar Millner (1899–1988), Zoltán Bay (1900–1992), Imre Bródy (1891–1944), György Szigeti (1905–1978), and many others.
