= György Szigeti =

Hungarian physicist and engineer (1905–1978)

György Szigeti (29 January 1905 – 27 November 1978), was a Hungarian physicist and engineer who developed tungsten lamps.

In 1923, at Tungsram Ltd., a research laboratory was established for improving light sources, mainly electric bulbs. The head of that laboratory was Ignácz Pfeiffer (1867–1941), whose research staff included Szigeti, along with Zoltán Bay (1900–1992), Tivadar Millner, Imre Bródy (1891–1944), Ernő Winter (1897–1971), and others.

Szigeti worked together with Zoltán Bay on metal-vapor lamps and fluorescent light sources. They received a U.S. patent on "electroluminescent light sources" that were made of silicon carbide; these light sources were the ancestors of light-emitting diodes.
