= Tivadar Millner =

Hungarian chemical engineer and inventor (1899–1988)

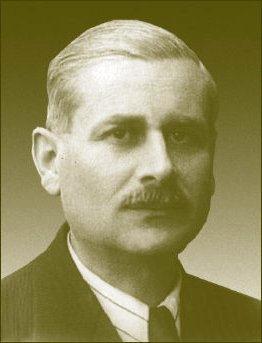
Tivadar Millner

Tivadar Millner (7 March 1899 – 28 October 1988) was a Hungarian chemical engineer, educator, and inventor who developed tungsten lamps. Working at Tungsram, Millner, along with Pál Túry, co-developed large-crystal tungsten technology for the production of more reliable and longer-lasting coiled filament lamps.

In 1923 at Tungsram Ltd., a research laboratory was established for improving light sources, mainly electric bulbs. The head of that laboratory was Ignácz Pfeiffer (1867-1941), whose research staff included Millner, along with Zoltán Bay (1900-1992), Imre Bródy (1891-1944), György Szigeti (1905-1978), and Ernő Winter (1897-1971).
