= Imre Bródy =

Hungarian physicist (1891–1944)

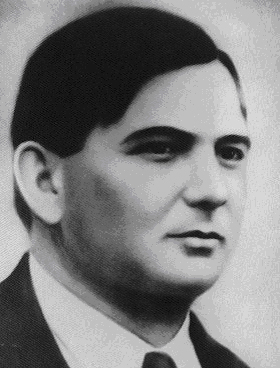

Imre Bródy (1891, Gyula, Hungary–1944, Mühldorf) was a Hungarian physicist who invented in 1930 the krypton-filled fluorescent lamps (also known as the krypton electric bulb), with fellow-Hungarian inventors Emil Theisz, Ferenc Kőrösy and Tivadar Millner. He developed the technology of the production of krypton bulbs together with Michael Polanyi (Hungarian: Polányi Mihály). He was the nephew of writer Sándor Bródy.

== Career ==
Educated in Budapest, he wrote his doctoral thesis on the chemical constant of monatomic gases. After teaching in a high school, he became an assistant professor in applied physics at the University of Sciences and accomplished valuable theoretical work investigating specific heat and molecular heat. From 1920 he worked with Max Born as assistant to the professor in Göttingen. They jointly worked out the dynamic theory of crystals. He returned home in 1923 and worked at Tungsram as an engineer to his death.

Later in life, Bródy worked on new light source problems. He stayed with his family after the German occupation of Hungary in 1944, and the immunity promised by the factory to him could not save his life. Being Jewish, he was murdered on 20 December 1944, at age 53, in Mühldorf subcamp, a satellite system of the Dachau concentration camp.

The research institute of Tungsram, now part of General Electric, in Budapest is named after him.

== The krypton lamp ==
Bródy in 1930 filled lamps with krypton gas in lieu of argon. Since the new gas was expensive, he developed a process with his colleagues to obtain krypton from air. Production of krypton filled lamps based on his invention started at Ajka in 1937, in a factory co-designed by Polányi and Hungarian-born physicist Egon Orowan. The invention was the most economic bulb in the age, a real sensation at the time, which for decades was one of the most successful export products of Hungary, however the factory was destroyed by the German Wehrmacht in 1942 and Germany became the biggest exporter of krypton bulbs until the 1990s.
