= Tone at the top =

Term in accounting regarding the ethical climate of an organization

"Tone at the top" is a term that originated in the field of accounting and is used to describe an organization's general ethical climate, as established by its board of directors, audit committee, and senior management. Having good tone at the top is believed by business ethics experts to help prevent fraud and other unethical practices. The very same idea is expressed in negative terms by the old saying "A fish rots from the head down".

== Origins ==
The concept of tone at the top originated in audit firms, where it referred fairly narrowly to the attitude of an organization's senior leadership towards internal financial controls. It was popularized following a series of major corporate accounting scandals such as those affecting Enron, Tyco International, Adelphia, Peregrine Systems and WorldCom, when the concept was strongly emphasized in the Sarbanes–Oxley Act of 2002 as important in the prevention and detection of fraud and other unethical financial practices. Today the term is applied very broadly, including in the fields of general management, information security, law and software development, and is often used to describe the general corporate culture established by an organization's leadership.

== Overview ==
The tone at the top is often considered to permeate an entire organization, and good tone at the top is considered a prerequisite for solid corporate governance. It has been said that boards of directors have a dual role: creating codes of conduct, and living by them.

Good organizational tone is set through policies, codes of ethics, a commitment to hiring competent employees, and the development of reward structures that promote good internal controls and effective governance. In an analysis of ethical leadership, KPMG described ethical leaders as those who are receptive to employees' ethical concerns, value ethics and integrity over short-term business goals, and respond appropriately if they become aware of misconduct.

Auditors typically interview an organization's leaders as part of the audit fieldwork in order to assess tone at the top, because poor tone is associated with malfeasance. Questions commonly asked include "how is the board compensated," "how active is the audit committee," "what is the nature of the organization's corporate culture," "what pressures are there to make sales and earnings goals," "how is wrong-doing dealt with," "do employees understand their individual responsibilities for controls," "do monitoring controls signal failures in a timely fashion so corrective action can be taken," and "is there evidence that the employee code of ethics is complied with."

Important fraud factors include pressure to reach goals, incentives and meeting expectations.

== Failures ==
Experts say that weaknesses in the "tone at the top" have been associated with most modern financial frauds. Poor tone at the top may include a disdain for internal controls, an overemphasis on profits at the expense of ethics, a belief that compliance with the law is sufficient for defensible ethical conduct, the canvassing and accommodating of some stakeholders but not others, blaming higher-ups or colleagues for unethical practices, having one's judgement clouded due to conflicts of interest, and a misunderstanding of and lack of adherence to public expectations of what constitutes ethical behaviour for executives. Backdating stock options and pegging the granting of options to significant good or bad corporate announcements (known as spring-loading and bullet-dodging) are compensation practices that can be indicative of poor tone at the top.

=== Examples of failed tone at the top ===
==== The Enron scandal ====
The Enron scandal, revealed in October 2001, eventually led to the bankruptcy of the Enron Corporation, an American energy company based in Houston, Texas, and the de facto dissolution of Arthur Andersen, its audit firm. Enron is considered to be the largest bankruptcy reorganization in U.S. history, as well as the biggest audit failure. Executives at Enron used accounting loopholes, special purpose entities, and misleading financial reporting to hide billions in debt from failed deals and projects. Chief Financial Officer Andrew Fastow and other executives not only misled Enron's board of directors and audit committee on high-risk accounting practices, but also pressured Andersen to ignore the issues. The Enron story demonstrated many common features of failed tone at the top, including inappropriate hostility to critics and a misunderstanding of public expectations. In a conference call on April 17, 2001, after Wall Street analyst Richard Grubman complained that Enron wasn't releasing a balance sheet along with its financial statements, then-CEO Jeffrey Skilling responded "Well, thank you very much, we appreciate that ... asshole," a phrase that was met with dismay and astonishment by the media and public, but which became an inside joke among many Enron employees.

==== Arthur Andersen obstruction of justice ====
Arthur Andersen was criticized for being the only Big 5 audit firm to allow the partner in charge of an audit to override a ruling made by the quality control partner, and was found guilty in 2002 of obstruction of justice for shredding documents related to its audit of Enron, resulting in the Enron scandal. The Arthur Andersen story is now used in business ethics textbooks as an example of a failure of tone at the top, for emphasizing profitability over high ethical standards. See also Arthur Andersen LLP v. United States and the Enron scandal.

==== Xerox fined by SEC ====
In 2002, Xerox was fined $10 million by the U.S. Securities and Exchange Commission (SEC) for allegedly deceiving the public between 1997 and 2000 by employing several "accounting maneuvers," with six Xerox senior executives paying another $22 million in 2003. The SEC charged that former CEO Paul Allaire and his second-in-command G. Richard Thoman, who were among the six fined, "set a tone at the top of the company which equated business success with meeting short-term earnings targets."

==== Scandals at Fannie Mae ====
Business experts say that although the U.S. Federal National Mortgage Association (FNMA), colloquially known as Fannie Mae, gave the appearance of setting the appropriate tone at the top, its actual conduct fell short. In 2004, Fannie Mae was investigated by the U.S. Office of Federal Housing Enterprise Oversight (OFHEO), which alleged widespread accounting errors. In 2008 Fannie Mae was embroiled in several conflict of interest scandals, and in 2011 six of its executives, including 2005-2008 Fannie Mae CEO Daniel Mudd, were charged by the U.S. Securities and Exchange Commission with securities fraud. In May 2006, OFHEO released a "Report of the Special Examination of Fannie Mae" which argued that at Fannie Mae "earnings mattered, but not how they were achieved," and which blamed "the actions and inactions of the Board of Directors [which] inappropriately reinforced rather than checked the tone and culture set by [1999-2004 Fannie Mae CEO Franklin] Raines and other senior managers." Former OFHEA head Armando Falcon attributed Fannie Mae's problems to "the arrogance and huge egos of senior management," saying "it was always just groupthink and if you ever raised a dissenting voice, your career would be over. Ego and arrogance was visible everywhere, in everything the company did: how it treated counterparties in the marketplace it dealt in, how it was able to throw its weight around politically, the way it spent money to curry political loyalty, the arrogance that permeated everything that the company did, including ultimately the accounting misconduct, and the lack of any kind of corporate ethics." See also the 2004 Fannie Mae accounting controversy, the Countrywide Financial political loan scandal and Friends of Angelo VIP program, and the 2011 Fannie Mae SEC charges.

==== 2008 financial crisis ====
The 2008 financial crisis, considered by many economists to be the worst financial crisis since the Great Depression of the 1930s, was investigated by the U.S. Financial Crisis Inquiry Commission, which concluded that "the crisis was avoidable and was caused by: Widespread failures in financial regulation, including the Federal Reserve’s failure to stem the tide of toxic mortgages; Dramatic breakdowns in corporate governance including too many financial firms acting recklessly and taking on too much risk; An explosive mix of excessive borrowing and risk by households and Wall Street that put the financial system on a collision course with crisis; Key policy makers ill prepared for the crisis, lacking a full understanding of the financial system they oversaw; and systemic breaches in accountability and ethics at all levels," and laid the blame for the crisis with government and regulatory leaders and CEOs of the failed companies, saying "tone at the top does matter and, in this instance, we were let down. No one said 'no'."

==== Tyco Scandal ====
Former chairman and chief executive Dennis Kozlowski and former chief financial officer Mark H. Swartz were accused of the theft of more than $150 million from the company. During their trial in March 2004, they contended the board of directors authorized it as compensation.

During jury deliberations, juror Ruth Jordan, while passing through the courtroom, appeared to make an "okay" sign with her fingers to the defense table. She later denied she had intended that gesture, but the incident received much publicity (including a caricature in The Wall Street Journal), and the juror received threats after her name became public. Judge Michael Obus declared a mistrial on April 2, 2004.

On June 17, 2005, after a retrial, Kozlowski and Swartz were convicted on all but one of the more than 30 counts against them. The verdicts carry potential jail terms of up to 25 years in state prison. Kozlowski himself was sentenced to no less than eight years and four months and no more than 25 years in prison. Swartz received the same sentence. Then in May 2007, New Hampshire Federal District Court Judge Paul Barbadoro approved a class action settlement whereby Tyco agreed to pay $2.92 billion (in conjunction with $225 million by Pricewaterhouse Coopers, their auditors) to a class of defrauded shareholders represented by Grant & Eisenhofer P.A., Schiffrin, Barroway, Topaz & Kessler, and Milberg Weiss & Bershad.

==== MCI Inc/WorldCom ====
CEO Bernard Ebbers was accused of accounting fraud. Ebbers had become very wealthy from the rising price of his holdings in WorldCom common stock. However, in the year 2000, the telecommunications industry entered a downturn and WorldCom's aggressive growth strategy suffered a serious setback when it was forced by the US Justice Department to abandon its proposed merger with Sprint in mid 2000. By that time, WorldCom's stock price was declining and Ebbers came under increasing pressure from banks to cover margin calls on his WorldCom stock that was used to finance his other businesses (timber and yachting, among others). During 2001, Ebbers persuaded WorldCom's board of directors to provide him corporate loans and guarantees in excess of $400 million to cover his margin calls. The board hoped that the loans would avert the need for Ebbers to sell substantial amounts of his WorldCom stock, as his doing so would put further downward pressure on the stock's price. However, this strategy ultimately failed and Ebbers was ousted as CEO in April 2002 and replaced by John Sidgmore, former CEO of UUNET Technologies, Inc.

Beginning modestly in mid-year 1999 and continuing at an accelerated pace through May 2002, the company (under the direction of Ebbers, Scott Sullivan (CFO), David Myers (Comptroller) and Buford "Buddy" Yates (Director of General Accounting)) used fraudulent accounting methods to mask its declining earnings by painting a false picture of financial growth and profitability to prop up the price of WorldCom's stock.

The fraud was accomplished primarily in two ways:

1. Booking ‘line costs’ (interconnection expenses with other telecommunication companies) as capital on the balance sheet instead of expenses.
2. Inflating revenues with bogus accounting entries from "corporate unallocated revenue accounts".

In 2002, a small team of internal auditors at WorldCom worked together, often at night and in secret, to investigate and unearth $3.8 billion in fraud. Shortly thereafter, the company's audit committee and board of directors were notified of the fraud and acted swiftly: Sullivan was fired, Myers resigned, Arthur Andersen withdrew its audit opinion for 2001, and the U.S. Securities and Exchange Commission (SEC) launched an investigation into these matters on June 26, 2002 (see accounting scandals). By the end of 2003, it was estimated that the company's total assets had been inflated by around $11 billion.

==== ImClone Systems trading case ====
ImClone's stock price dropped sharply at the end of 2001 when its drug Erbitux, an experimental monoclonal antibody, failed to get the expected Food and Drug Administration (FDA) approval. It was later revealed by the U.S. Securities and Exchange Commission that numerous executives sold their stock before the announcement of the decision after the close of trading on December 28.

Its founder, Samuel D. Waksal, was arrested in 2002 on insider trading charges for informing friends and family to sell their stock, and attempting to sell his own. His daughter, Aliza Waksal, sold $2.5 million in shares on December 27. His father, Jack Waksal, sold $8.1 million in shares over the 27th and 28th. Company executives had done the same. John B. Landes, the general counsel, sold $2.5 million in shares on December 6. Ronald A. Martell, the vice president for marketing and sales, sold $2.1 million in shares on December 11. Four other executives sold shares in the following weeks as well. Later, Samuel Waksal pleaded guilty to various charges, including securities fraud, and on June 10, 2003, was sentenced to seven years and three months in prison.
