= Ursula Burns =

American businessperson

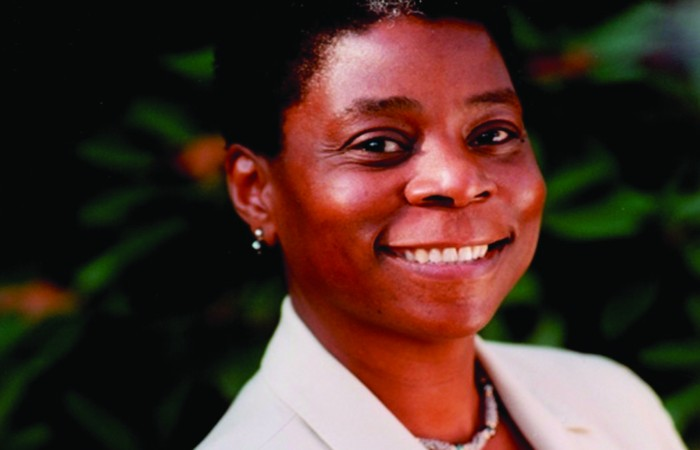
- Burns in 2004
- Born: September 20, 1958 (age 68); New York City, U.S.
- Education: Brooklyn Polytechnic Institute (BS); Columbia University (MS)
- Known for: Former CEO of Xerox
- Title: Co-Founder, Integrum Holdings and Non-Executive Chairwoman, Teneo
- Spouse: Lloyd Bean (died 2019)
- Children: 2

Ursula M. Burns (born September 20, 1958) is an American businesswoman. Burns was the CEO of Xerox from 2009 to 2016. Burns was the first black woman to lead a Fortune 500 company. She is also the first woman to follow another as the head of a Fortune 500 company. Burns remained the chairman at Xerox from 2010 to 2017.

Burns was on the board of directors of Uber, American Express, and ExxonMobil. She was the chairperson and CEO of VEON from late 2018 to early 2020 and is the non-executive chairwoman of Teneo.

In 2021, Burns co-founded private equity firm Integrum Holdings.

Under President Barack Obama Burns led the White House national program on science, technology, engineering, and mathematics (STEM) from 2009 to 2016. Additionally, she was chairwoman of the President's Export Council from 2015 to 2016, following her role as vice chair from 2010 to 2015.

== Early life and education ==
Born in 1958, Burns was raised by a single mother in the Baruch Houses, a housing project in New York City. Both of her parents were Panamanian immigrants. She attended and graduated Cathedral High School, a Catholic all-girls school on East 56th Street in New York.

After high school, Burns attended Brooklyn Polytechnic Institute (now New York University Tandon School of Engineering) where in 1980 she earned a bachelor's degree in mechanical engineering as a first-generation college student. During that summer, she became a mechanical engineering summer intern at Xerox. This internship was an integral component of Xerox's graduate engineering initiative designed to support underrepresented minorities. It not only provided her with valuable experience but also financially supported her pursuit of a master's degree at Columbia University, which she completed in 1981.

She has received honorary degrees from New York University, Williams College, the University of Pennsylvania, Howard University, Rensselaer Polytechnic Institute, The City College of New York, Rochester Institute of Technology (RIT), the University of Rochester, Xavier University, and Georgetown University.

== Business career ==
=== Xerox ===
Burns began her journey with Xerox as a summer intern in 1980 and officially joined the company a year later, following the completion of her master's degree from Columbia University. She worked in various roles in product development and planning at the company for the remainder of the 1980s. In January 1990, her career took an unexpected turn when Wayland Hicks, then a senior executive, offered Burns a job as his executive assistant. She accepted and worked for him for roughly nine months before returning home because she was about to marry. In June 1991, she then became executive assistant to then-chairman and chief executive Paul Allaire. In 1999, she was named vice-president for global manufacturing. In May 2000, Burns was named senior vice president of corporate strategic services and began working closely with soon-to-be CEO Anne Mulcahy, in what both women have described as a true partnership. Two years later, Burns became president of business group operations.

In 2007, Burns assumed the role of president of Xerox. In July 2009 she was named CEO, succeeding Mulcahy, who remained as chairwoman until May 2010. The first black woman CEO to head a Fortune 500 company, Burns was also the first woman to succeed another woman as head of a Fortune 500 company. Shortly after being named CEO, Burns led the acquisition of Affiliated Computer Services. While as CEO, Burns was named an International Fellow of the Royal Academy of Engineering in 2013. In 2016, she led Xerox in a split into two independent companies: Xerox Corporation and Conduent Incorporated. She remained chairwoman and CEO of Xerox through the process, and was then appointed chairwoman of the standalone document technology company. After stepping down from the position in December 2016, Burns was succeeded by Jeff Jacobson. She retained the title of chairwoman of the newly formed document technology company until May 2017, when she left the Xerox board and her role as chair.

=== Board roles ===
Burns has been on numerous boards, including those of Exxon Mobil Corporation, American Express Corporation, Datto Inc., Nestlé, Boston Scientific, FIRST, the National Association of Manufacturers, the University of Rochester, the MIT Corporation, the Rochester Business Alliance, and the RUMP Group. She joined Teneo as a senior advisor in June 2017. Burns joined the board of directors of Uber in late September 2017. In 2020, she was appointed to the board of directors of Waystar. Burns also remains on the boards of Endeavor Group Holdings and IHS Holding. In addition, Burns is on several private company boards, while also providing leadership counsel to several community, educational and non-profit organizations including the Ford Foundation, the Metropolitan Museum of Art, and the Mayo Clinic, amongst others.

In April 2024, Burns was nominated for the board of directors of Taiwan Semiconductor Manufacturing Co.

=== Veon ===
In July 2017, Burns was elected chairman of VEON, the world's 11th largest telecom service provider by subscribers, by its board of directors. With the sudden departure of the CEO in March 2018, she was made executive chairwoman pending a selection process, and in December 2018, she was appointed as CEO.

In February 2020, Kaan Terzioğlu and Sergi Herrero were appointed co-CEOs, succeeding Burns. In June 2020, Gennady Gazin succeeded Burns as chairman.

=== Diageo ===
Burns was announced to be joining Diageo board as a non-executive director, but Diageo announced in March 2018 that "Burns will not take up her appointment as Non-Executive Director on the Diageo Board" as she has been appointed as interim Executive Chairman of VEON.

=== Integrum Holdings ===
In 2021, Burns partnered with Tagar Olson and Richard Kunzer to co-found private equity firm Integrum Holdings. The firm, which raised $1.1bn for its inaugural fund, focuses on technology-enabled services companies.

== Public service ==
U.S. President Barack Obama appointed Burns to help lead the White House National STEM program in 2009, and she remained a leader of the STEM program until 2016. In March 2010 President Obama appointed Burns as vice-chair of the President's Export Council, a role which she held from 2015 to 2016.

In February 2022, Burns joined the U.S. Department of Commerce's Advisory Council on Supply Chain Competitiveness as Vice Chair.

== Community activities ==
Burns provides leadership counsel to community, educational, and non-profit organizations including FIRST (For Inspiration and Recognition of Science and Technology), National Academy Foundation, MIT, and the U.S. Olympic Committee, among others. She is a founding board director of Change the Equation, which focuses on improving the U.S.'s education system in science, technology, engineering, and math (STEM). She was vice chairwoman of the executive committee of The Business Council between 2013 and 2014. She has delivered the commencement address at universities including Rochester Institute of Technology, MIT, the University of Rochester, Xavier University, Howard University, Williams College, and Georgetown University.

In 2016, hacked emails suggested she was on a list of potential candidates for vice-president for Hillary Clinton.

== Personal life ==
Burns was married to Lloyd Bean until his death in 2019; he also worked at Xerox, and they lived in Rochester, New York. She has a daughter Melissa (born c. 1992) and a stepson Malcolm (born c. 1989) who attended MIT. Burns delivered the MIT commencement address at her son's graduation in 2011. Two years prior, she delivered the commencement address at Rochester Institute of Technology. Burns has contributed to McQuaid Jesuit High School in New York.

== Memoir ==
Burns published a memoir, Where You Are Is Not Who You Are: A Memoir, in 2021.

== See also ==
- List of Afro-Latinos
- List of International Fellows of the Royal Academy of Engineering

Business positions
Preceded by Anne Mulcahy	President of Xerox; 2007–2009	Vacant
Preceded by Anne Mulcahy	Chief Executive Officer of Xerox; 2009–2016	Succeeded by Jeff Jacobson
Preceded by Anne Mulcahy	Chair of Xerox; 2010–2017	Succeeded by Keith Cozza
