= G. Richard Thoman =

American businessman

- Born: Gordon Richard Thoman
- Education: McGill University (BA); Graduate Institute of International and Development Studies
- Occupation: Businessman

Gordon Richard Thoman (often known as G. Richard Thoman or Rick Thoman) is an American businessman who was president and CEO of Xerox Corporation, and CFO and senior vice president of IBM.

== Early life and education ==
Thoman was born in the U.S. and holds American citizenship. He went to high school in Kingston, Ontario, while his father taught economic geography at Queen's University there. Thoman played basketball, joined the debating team, and got B's in French, straight A's in everything else.

Thoman attended McGill University in Montreal, Quebec, where he eventually earned a bachelor of arts in economics and political science, and spent the summer of his junior year working for a bank in Marseille, France. He then completed three advanced degrees from the Fletcher School of Law and Diplomacy at Tufts University—a masters in international studies, a masters in international economics from the Graduate Institute of International Studies, Geneva and a doctorate in international economics from Tufts.

Before joining McKinsey, Thoman worked in finance at Citicorp and Exxon.

== Career ==
Thoman became a longtime protégé of Louis V. Gerstner, Jr., when they first met at McKinsey & Company, and they subsequently worked together at American Express, RJR Nabisco, and IBM.

Thoman and Gerstner were responsible for the remarkable rejuvenation of IBM's fortunes; Thoman was Senior Vice President and general manager of IBM's Personal Systems Group which he led a successful turnaround and was later promoted to Senior Vice President and chief financial officer of IBM. However, as Gerstner had no plans to step aside in the 1990s, and being of a similar age, Thoman had to look outside for opportunities to run a major public company.

When Thoman was announced as president and COO of Xerox, which positioned him as the eventual successor to Paul Allaire, this news caused the company shares to rise $2 (2.9%) to $71.75, after earlier touching a record $73.25 on the New York Stock Exchange. Thoman, who assumed his duties on June 30, 1997, was the first outsider in the long history of Xerox to be positioned as the next chief executive.

On April 1, 1999 at the company annual meeting, Thoman became CEO while Allaire remained chairman of the board. Allaire had intended to retire but the board convinced him to stay on since Thoman was an outsider. As a nod to CFO Barry D. Romeril and William F. Buehler, who were Allaire loyalists that were ending up passed over in the succession planning, Allaire requested to Thoman that they be given seats on the board as vice-chairman.

As well as being Xerox's president and CEO, in 1999–2000 Thoman served as US head of the Transatlantic Dialogue to work with European corporate CEOs, the US Secretary of Commerce, the US Trade Representative and the EC Commissioner to standardize corporate regulations, where he met French President Jacques Chirac.

Allaire and Thoman both shared the vision that Xerox needed to reinvent itself to succeed in the Digital Age, and Thoman's record of working with Gerstner in IBM's turnaround made him the ideal person to lead the transformation. However, it has been reported that many of Xerox's senior executives including Romeril and Buehler remained loyal to Allaire and viewed Thoman as an outsider. These undercut Thoman's authority as CEO, as he was only able to make a few senior management changes, and the entrenched bureaucracy as Xerox (nicknamed "Burox") provided passive resistance to Thoman's initiatives. This in turn may have contributed to several botched reorganizations under his tenure, particularly the realignment of the sales force.

Thoman was forced to resign on May 11, 2000, with Allaire resuming the role of CEO and he promoted Anne M. Mulcahy to president and COO.

Thoman then joined Evercore Partners as a senior advisor.

Allaire, Thoman, Romeril, and three other senior Xerox executives paid the SEC the sum of $22 million to settle accusations by securities regulators that they participated in a large accounting fraud that allowed the company to overstate its profits by $1.4 billion from 1997 to 2000. As the "Xerox six" were not found guilty of wrongdoing, Xerox said that it would reimburse the executives for all but $3 million of the $22 million and cover their legal fees. The $3 million was classified as a fine by the S.E.C. and cannot be reimbursed under its rules.

Business positions
Vacant Title last held by David T. Kearns	President of Xerox Corporation; June 30, 1997 – May 11, 2000	Succeeded by Anne M. Mulcahy
Preceded by Paul Allaire	CEO of Xerox Corporation; April 1, 1999 – May 11, 2000	Succeeded by Paul Allaire
