= Jeff Jacobson (CEO) =

American business executive

- Born: 1959 (age 66–67)
- Other name: Jeffrey Jacobson
- Education: State University of New York Buffalo (BS)
- Alma mater: Cornell University School of Industrial Relations (MS); Pace University School of Law (JD)
- Occupation: Business executive
- Years active: 1990s-present
- Employer(s): Electronics For Imaging, Siris Capital
- Board member of: Electronics For Imaging

Jeff Jacobson (born 1959) is an American business executive. He is the executive chairman of Electronics For Imaging (EFI), and an executive partner at SIRIS Capital Group LLC. He was the CEO of EFI, Xerox Corporation, Presstek, Kodak Polychrome Graphics, and COO of Kodak's Graphic Communications Group.

== Biography ==
Born circa 1959, Jeff Jacobson grew up in Brooklyn, New York City, The Bronx, and Yonkers. He graduated from the State University of New York Buffalo in 1981 with a Bachelor of Science degree. He then earned a master's degree from the Cornell University School of Industrial Relations, followed by a juris doctor degree from Pace University School of Law. Jacobson is a member of the New York State Bar Association and the New Jersey State Bar Association. From 1998 to 2005, Jacobson held executive positions at Kodak Polychrome Graphics, a joint venture between Kodak and Sun Chemical. Starting in human resources, he then was the company's CEO, where according to the Rochester Business Journal he led a "turnaround" resulting in the sale of the company to Kodak, where he then was chief operating officer of Kodak's $3.6 billion Graphic Communications Group. From 2007 until 2012 he was president and CEO of Presstek, a manufacturer of digital offset printing products, and chairman for three years.

In February 2012, Jacobson joined Xerox as president of Global Graphic Communications Operations, working out of Xerox's headquarters in Norwalk, Connecticut. In 2014 he became the president and chief operating officer of Xerox Technology. On June 23, 2016, he was announced as the future CEO of Xerox, succeeding Ursula Burns. He became Xerox CEO on January 1, 2017, also joining the board. He announced a number of changes at Xerox in 2017, including its largest product launch, as well as a new focus on "small and midsize" companies to "cut dependence on its large enterprise customers," with the latter seen by analysts as a declining market. Also overseeing job cuts and an effort to achieve "$1.5 billion in improved operational efficiencies," he described Xerox as "pursuing R&D" in areas such as content management, graphic communications, printed electronics, smart labels, and "direct-to-object" printing techniques. In June 2017, he was a signatory on the CEO Action for Diversity & Inclusion initiative. On May 1, 2018, Xerox announced that under a deal with dissident investor Carl Icahn, Jacobson would resign as chief executive and director. Three days later, the company announced that the deal would not go into effect, although on May 16, 2018, he was indeed succeeded by John Visentin. Jacobson was then appointed executive chairman of Electronics for Imaging (EFI), a technology company headquartered in Fremont, California, in July 2019. He also became an executive partner at Siris Capital, EFI's owner, and on August 13, 2019, he was appointed EFI's new chief executive officer. In January 2023, Jacobson was succeeded as EFI CEO by Frank Pennisi, with Jacobson continuing as EFI chairman. Jacobson also became executive chairman of Fiery, a new EFI spinoff company. The University at Buffalo School of Management awarded him its Centennial Achievement and Impact Award in Sept. 2023.
