= Archie McCardell =

American business leader

Archie R. McCardell
- Born: August 29, 1926; Hazel Park, Michigan, U.S.
- Died: July 10, 2008 (aged 81); Casper, Wyoming, U.S.
- Education: University of Michigan
- Occupations: Corporate executive at Ford Motor Company, Xerox, International Harvester
- Spouse: Margaret Martin McCardell
- Children: Sandra McCardell, Laurie McCardell, Clay McCardell

Archie R. McCardell (August 29, 1926 – July 10, 2008) was an American business leader. He was best known for his tenure as chief executive officer, president, and chairman of the board at the International Harvester farm and heavy equipment manufacturing concern from 1977 to 1982. Although Harvester was the nation's fourth-largest company at the time he assumed control, McCardell triggered a strike by unionized employees which ended disastrously for the company and led to its eventual demise.

== Early life ==
Archie McCardell was born in Hazel Park, Michigan in August 1926. He served in the United States Army Air Forces in World War II. Following his time in the service, he attended the University of Michigan (he was the first person in his family to attend college), where he earned a bachelor's degree and a Master of Business Administration.

== Business career ==
After leaving school in 1949, McCardell became a financial analyst at the Ford Motor Company, and was appointed secretary-treasurer of Ford's operation in Australia and later director of finance for Ford's division in Cologne.

=== Xerox ===
McCardell became group president for corporate services at Xerox in 1966. The post of executive vice president for operations was created for him in 1968, and he was named president of the company in 1971. During his tenure, Xerox introduced its first color copier.

During McCardell's reign at Xerox, the company announced record revenues, earnings and profits in 1973, 1974, and 1975. Although these accomplishments were lauded by the press as a sign of McCardell's management expertise, the company had been setting records in key financial indicators for 20 years. More troubling were signs that the company was actually stumbling financially: The cost of new products was zooming out of control, most of the company's growth was coming from overseas operations rather than the large American domestic market, and Xerox seemed to have no clear strategic vision.

McCardell departed Xerox for International Harvester in August 1977, just as the company's profits began dropping.

=== International Harvester ===
McCardell was appointed president and chief operating officer of International Harvester on August 3, 1977. He received a then-exorbitant salary of $460,000 (making him one of the highest-paid CEOs in the country), a $1.5 million signing bonus and a $1.8 million loan at 6 percent interest. He was named chief executive officer in January 1978.

He instituted an aggressive cost-cutting program which immediately cut spending by $640 million and a modernization program which poured $879 million over three years into the company's plants. His actions boosted market share, and led to record sales of $8.4 billion and record profits of $370 million (up from $203 million). Despite McCardell's actions, IH's profit margins were still only half those of competitors like Caterpillar Inc. and Deere & Company.

In the fall of 1979, rather than undertake more traditional cost-cutting measures, McCardell pressed for concessions from the United Auto Workers (a trade union which had represented Harvester's workers since the early 1950s). McCardell's inexperience at labor relations, his rigid bargaining stance, misjudgments about the union's ability to withstand a long strike, and other factors triggered a 172-day strike which began on November 1, 1979, and ended on April 20, 1980. The strike was the longest ever at International Harvester, and as of August 2008 is still the fourth-longest strike in United Auto Worker history. When a final agreement came, the union retained nearly everything McCardell had sought to change, and International Harvester had lost $479.4 million during the strike and $397.3 million in the next fiscal year.

The strike severely impacted the company's financial status. International Harvester lost $257.2 million in the second quarter, for a total of $479.4 million in the first half of the year, while sales slid 47.3 percent. The company put its utility vehicle division up for sale to help cover the losses, and by the end of April 1980 was forced to take out loans which increased its short-term debt from $442 million to a staggering $1 billion. But International Harvester never recovered from the strike. In November 1981, IH asked the UAW for $100 million in wage and benefit concessions. Rising interest rates, demand weakened by the early 1980s recession, and high manufacturing costs pushed the company's total debt to a whopping $4.5 billion. On December 23, 1981, the company reached an agreement with 200 of its lenders to refinance $4.15 billion of its debt in a bid to avoid bankruptcy. McCardell announced $200 million in more cuts. On January 20, 1982, the UAW rejected Harvester's request for concessions because McCardell had just given $6 million in bonuses to salaried employees. But with the firm's financial condition rapidly worsening, the UAW reopened negotiations in March 1982. Negotiators reached a tentative agreement nearly two years to the day after the 1979–1980 strike ended, giving Harvester $200 million in wage, benefit, pension, and other savings over three years.

International Harvester was also sued over McCardell's $1.8 million forgiven loan, and was unable to have the suit dismissed.

On May 3, 1982, one day after the UAW ratified the concessionary contract, Archie McCardell was fired by International Harvester. Although McCardell asserted he had resigned, industry and press observers said that he was fired. Time reported that the company's 16-member board of directors met in a two-hour meeting over the weekend. Pushed by the company's debtor banks, the board finally agreed to fire McCardell. "The real wonder was that McCardell had not been ousted much earlier," Time said. He was replaced as chairman and CEO by Louis W. Menk and president Warren J. Hayford was replaced by Donald D. Lennox.

The company's downward financial spiral continued. For fiscal year 1980, 1981, and 1982, International Harvester incurred a combined three-year loss of $2.4 billion—the largest such three-year loss for any American company in history at the time. International Harvester sold its farm equipment division to Tenneco in 1985, and changed its name in 1986 to Navistar International.

Speaking to a group at Harvard Business School six months after leaving Harvester, McCardell was asked his assessment of his performance; he said that despite some regrets, "I think I rate myself superb." In 1986, McCardell told UPI, "I feel very good about my years at Harvester. We had a few good years. I don’t think we made any one major mistake. In retrospect, I think we could have done some things differently. None of us was smart enough – myself included – to realize the depth of the problem." Discussing his remuneration, he said he thought, in retrospect, that he was "underpaid".

== Later career ==
McCardell moved to Fairfield, Connecticut, where he purchased the original Pepperidge Farm, the 320-acre (130 ha) farm owned by Margaret Rudkin which had lent its name to the baking company Pepperidge Farm. McCardell began developing the farm into an affluent subdivision known as The Ridge.

He was elected to the board of directors of Computer Communications Inc. in 1984, but the company later folded. He also ran a company which took tourists on scuba diving trips, and owned several other small businesses.

== Personal life ==
McCardell was married to Margaret (née Martin). The couple had children.

He died at his home in Casper, Wyoming on July 10, 2008, of complications from heart failure.; His children and two brothers and a sister survived him.

== Notes ==
Business positions
Preceded by C. Peter McColough	Chairman of Xerox Corporation; December 13, 1971 – 1977	Succeeded by David T. Kearns
Vacant Title last held by Frank W. Jenks	CEO of International Harvester; August 3, 1977 – May 3, 1982	Succeeded by Louis W. Menk
