= Anne M. Mulcahy =

Former CEO of Xerox Corporation

Anne Mulcahy
- Born: Anne Dolan; October 21, 1952 (age 74); Rockville Centre, New York, U.S.
- Education: Fordham University (BA)
- Spouse: Joseph Mulcahy
- Children: 2

Anne M. Mulcahy (born October 21, 1952) is the former chairperson and CEO of Xerox Corporation. She was named CEO of Xerox on August 1, 2001, and chairwoman on January 1, 2002. In addition to serving on the Xerox board, she has been a member of the boards of directors of Catalyst, Citigroup Inc., Fuji Xerox Co. Ltd. and Target Corporation as well as Graham Holdings,which she has chaired since 2023.

She was selected as 'CEO of the Year 2008' by Chief Executive magazine. She announced her retirement as CEO on May 21, 2009, prior to the company's annual shareholder meeting.

== Early life and education ==
Mulcahy was born in Rockville Centre, New York on October 21, 1952. She was the only daughter in her family and attended Catholic school as a child. She received a B.A. in English and Journalism from Marymount College of Fordham University in Tarrytown, New York.

== Career at Xerox ==
Mulcahy joined Xerox as a field sales representative in 1976 and rose through the ranks. From 1992 to 1995, Mulcahy was vice president for human resources, responsible for compensation, benefits, human resource strategy, labor relations, management development, and employee training. She became a chief staff officer in 1997 and corporate senior vice president in 1998. Prior to that, she served as vice president and staff officer for Customer Operations, covering South America and Central America, Europe, Asia, Africa, and China. Though never intent on running Xerox, she was selected by the board of directors in 2001. During her tenure, Mulcahy led a restructuring that cut annual expenses by $1.7 billion, eliminated 25,000 jobs and sold $2.3 billion in non-core assets to reduce long-term debt.

When she became CEO on Aug 1, 2001, the stock price was $8.25, and on Jan 1, 2002. when she became chairwoman. the stock price was $10.05. On May 21, 2009, the day she announced her retirement as CEO, the stock price was $6.82.

Mulcahy served on four other Boards of Directors besides Xerox. She also served on Catalyst, Citigroup, Fuji Xerox, and Target Corp. A letter sent to Citi shareholders on March 26, 2009, by the labor union, American Federation of State County & Municipal Employees (AFSCME), recommended shareholders vote against re-electing six of their directors

== Recognition ==
The Wall Street Journal named Mulcahy one of 50 women to watch in 2005 and Forbes magazine ranked her at the sixth position among the Most Powerful Women in America in 2005. In 2009, she was ranked 15th. In 2008, she was selected by U.S. News & World Report as one of America's Best Leaders.

== Personal life ==
Mulcahy is married with two sons. She lives in Fairfield, Connecticut.

Business positions
Preceded by Paul Allaire	President of Xerox Corporation; 2000–2001	Succeeded by Ursula Burns
Preceded by Paul Allaire	CEO of Xerox Corporation; 2001–2009	Succeeded by Ursula Burns
Preceded by Paul Allaire	Chair of Xerox Corporation; 2002–2010	Succeeded by Ursula Burns
