= Xerox =

American document management corporation

Xerox Holdings Corporation

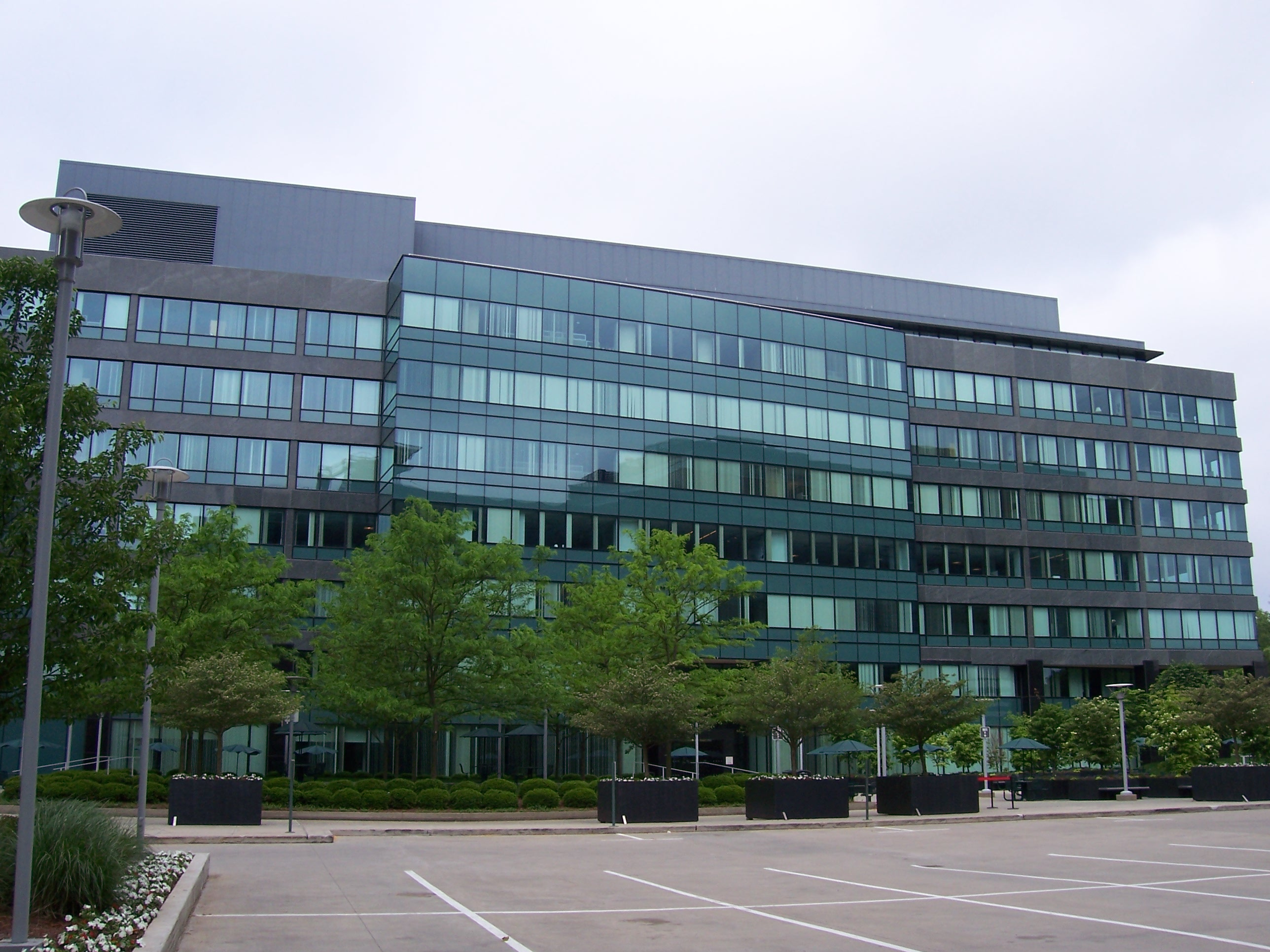
- Xerox Headquarters in Norwalk, Connecticut
- Formerly: Haloid Photographic Company (1906–1956); Haloid Xerox Inc. (1956–1961); Xerox Corporation (1961–2019)
- Type: Public
- Traded as: Nasdaq: XRX; NYSE: XRX (1961–2021)
- Industry: Information technology
- Founded: April 18, 1906; 120 years ago, in Rochester, New York, U.S.
- Founders: Joseph C. Wilson; Chester Carlson; Darcy Campbell
- Headquarters: Norwalk, Connecticut, U.S.
- Area served: Worldwide
- Key people: Scott Letier (chairman); Louie Pastor (CEO)
- Products: Office printers; Production printers & digital presses; Multi-function printers; Wide format printers, Projectors; Scanners; Copiers; Office equipment
- Services: Document services
- Revenue: ▼US$6.22 billion (2024)
- Operating income: ▼US$−1.2 billion (2024)
- Net income: ▼US$−1.3 billion (2024)
- Total assets: ▼US$8.37 billion (2024)
- Total equity: ▼US$1.08 billion (2024)
- Number of employees: 16,800 (2024)
- Subsidiaries: Affiliated Computer Services; CareAR; Xerox India
- Website: xerox.com

Xerox Holdings Corporation (/ˈzɪərɒks/, ZEER-oks) is an American corporation that sells printers, digital document products, and services in more than 160 countries. Xerox was the pioneer of the photocopier market, beginning with the introduction of the Xerox 914 in 1959, so much so that the word xerox is commonly used as a synonym for photocopy. Xerox is headquartered in Norwalk, Connecticut, though it is incorporated in New York with its largest group of employees based around Rochester, New York, where the company was founded. As a large, established business, it is consistently placed on the Fortune 500 list of companies.

The company purchased Affiliated Computer Services for $6.4 billion in early 2010. On December 31, 2016, Xerox separated its business process service operations, essentially those operations acquired with the purchase of Affiliated Computer Services, into a new publicly traded company, Conduent. Xerox focused on its document technology and document outsourcing business and traded on the NYSE from 1961 to 2021 and on the Nasdaq since 2021.

Researchers at Xerox and its Palo Alto Research Center invented several important elements of personal computing, such as the desktop metaphor GUI, the computer mouse and desktop computing. The concepts were adopted by Apple, Commodore and later Microsoft.

== History ==
Xerox was founded in 1906 in Rochester, New York, as Haloid. It manufactured photographic paper and equipment.

In 1938, Chester Carlson, a physicist working independently, invented a process for printing images using an electrically charged photoconductor-coated metal plate and dry powder “toner.” However, it would take over 20 years of refinement before the first automated machine to make copies was commercialized, using a document feeder, scanning light, and a rotating drum.

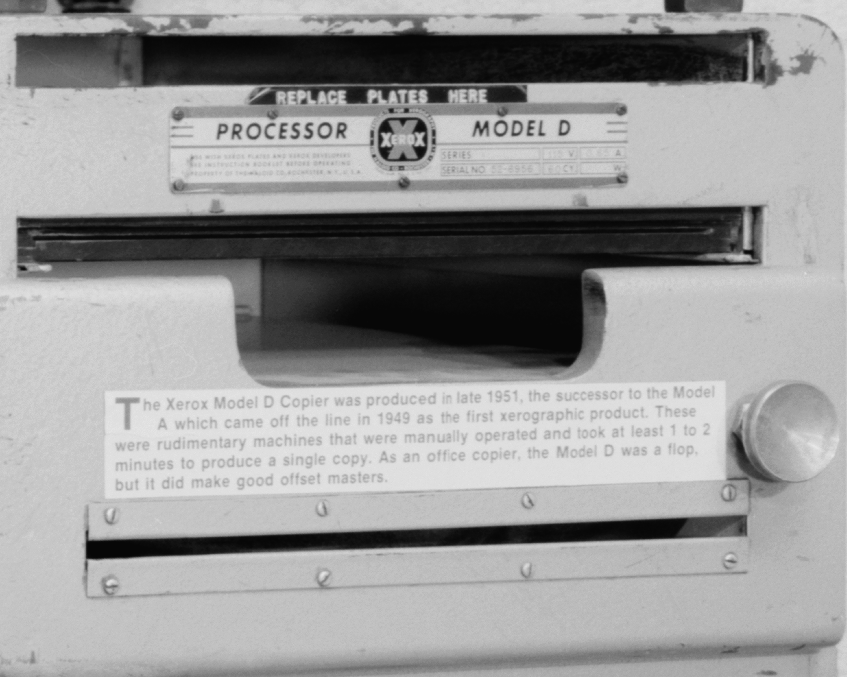
The Xerox Model D copier, introduced in 1951

Joseph C. Wilson, credited as the “founder of Xerox”, took over Haloid from his father. He saw the promise of Carlson's invention and, in 1946, signed an agreement to develop it as a commercial product. Wilson remained as President/CEO of Xerox until 1967 and served as chairman until his death in 1971.

Looking for a term to differentiate its new system, Haloid hired a Greek scholar at Ohio State University and coined the term xerography from two Greek roots meaning “dry writing.” Haloid changed its name to Haloid Xerox in 1958 and then Xerox in 1961.

Before releasing the 914, Xerox tested the market with a prototype hand-operated machine known as the Flat-plate 1385. The 1385 was not a viable copier because of its slow speed. Consequently, it was sold as a platemaker for the Addressograph-Multigraph Multilith 1250 and related sheet-fed offset printing presses in the offset lithography market. It was a higher-quality, commercially available plate camera mounted as a horizontal rostrum camera, complete with photo-flood lighting and a timer. The glass film/plate had been replaced with a selenium-coated aluminum plate. Electrics turned this into a quick-developing and reusable substitute for film. A skilled user could quickly produce paper and metal printing plates. Having started as a supplier to the offset lithography duplicating industry, Xerox then set its sights on capturing some of offset's market share.

The 1385 was followed by the first automatic xerographic printer, the Copyflo, in 1955. The Copyflo was a large microfilm printer that could produce positive prints on roll paper from any type of microfilm negative. Following the Copyflo, the process was scaled down to produce the 1824 microfilm printer. At about half the size and weight, this still sizable machine printed onto hand-fed, cut-sheet paper, which was pulled through the process by one of two gripper bars. A scaled-down version of this gripper feed system became the basis for the 813 desktop copier.

=== Xerox 914 ===
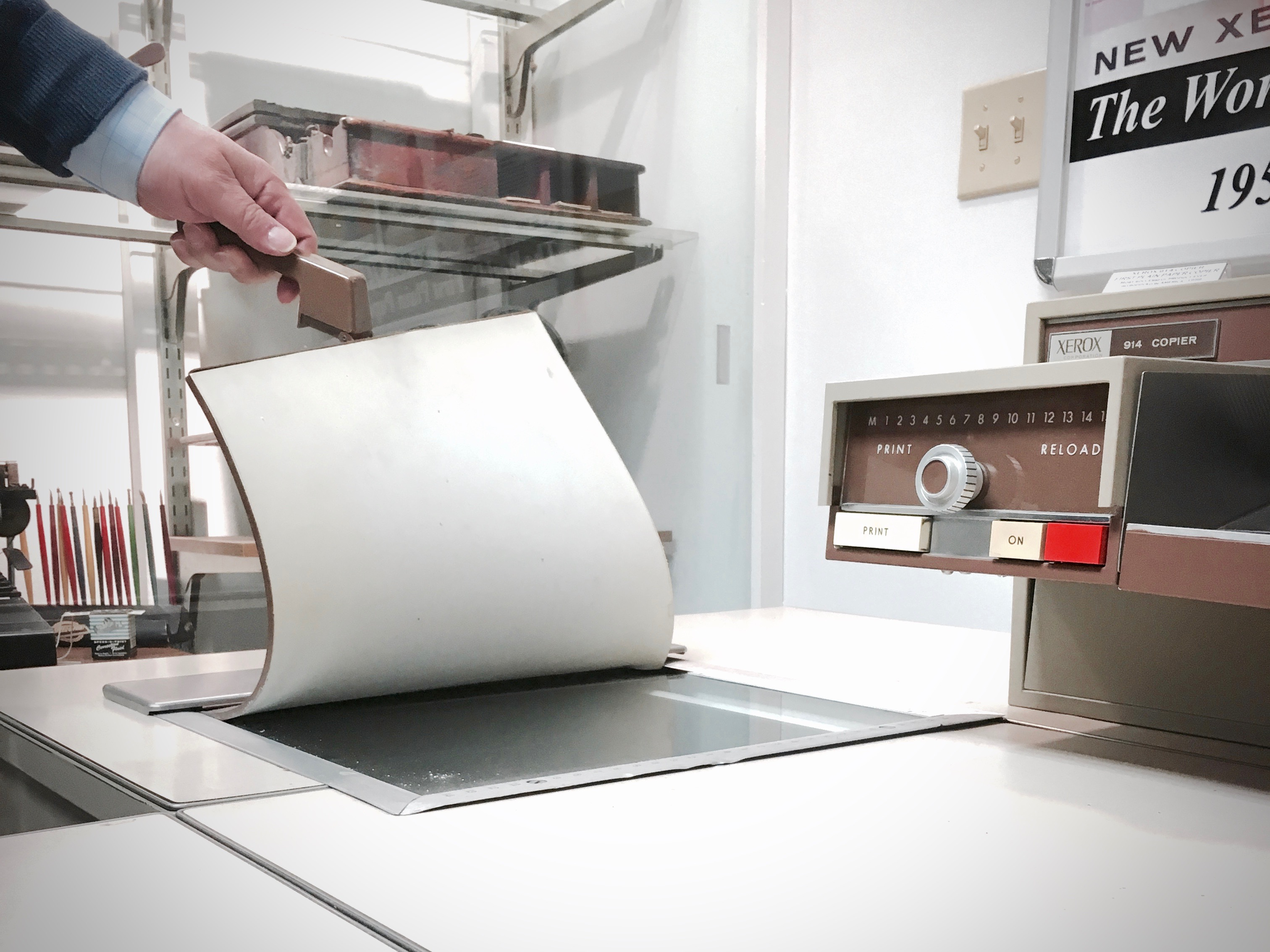
The Xerox 914 photocopier, introduced in 1959 and a highly successful product

The company came to prominence in 1959 with the introduction of the Xerox 914. The 914, the first plain paper photocopier, was developed by Carlson and John H. Dessauer; it was so popular that by the end of 1961, Xerox had almost $60 million in revenue. The product was sold by an innovative ad campaign showing that even monkeys could make copies at the touch of a button; simplicity became the foundation of Xerox products and user interfaces. Revenues leaped to over $500 million by 1965.

=== Xeronic Computer Printer ===
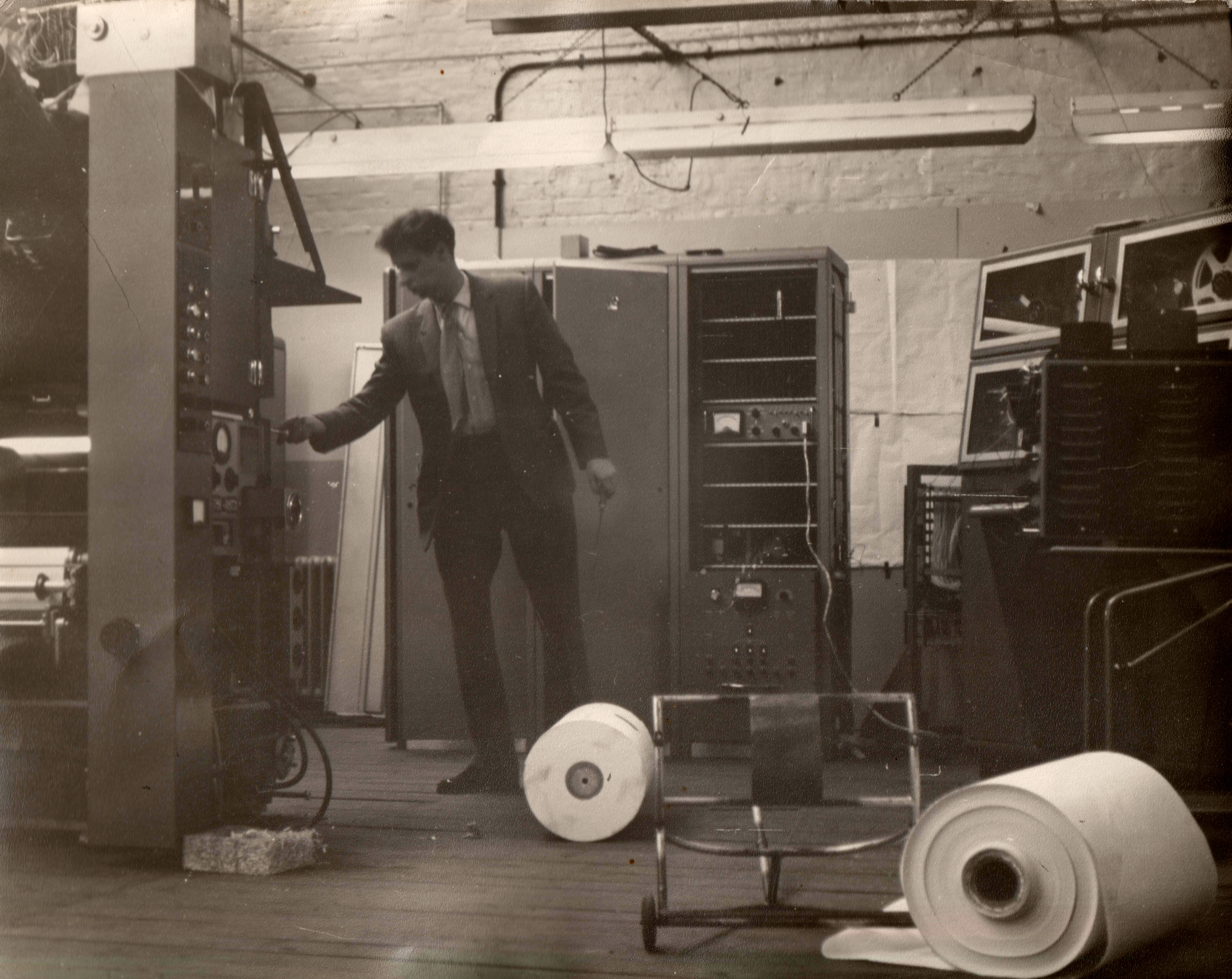
Peter James Greaves at the Rank Research Labs 1963: a project to attach a Xeronic printer to the Lyons Leo III

In 1956, Haloid formed a joint venture in the UK with Rank Organisation whose Rank Precision Industries subsidiary was charged with anglicizing the US products. Rank's Precision Industries went on to develop the Xeronic computer printer, and Rank Data Systems was set up to bring the product to market. It used cathode-ray tubes to generate the characters and forms that could be overlaid from microfilm images. Initially, it planned for the Ferranti and AEI computer companies to sell the Xeronic as an on-line peripheral, but due to interface problems, Rank switched to a magnetic tape off-line technique. In 1962, Lyons Computers placed an order for use with its LEO III computer, and the printer was delivered in 1964. It printed 2,888 lines per minute, slower than the target of 5,000 lpm.

=== 1960s ===
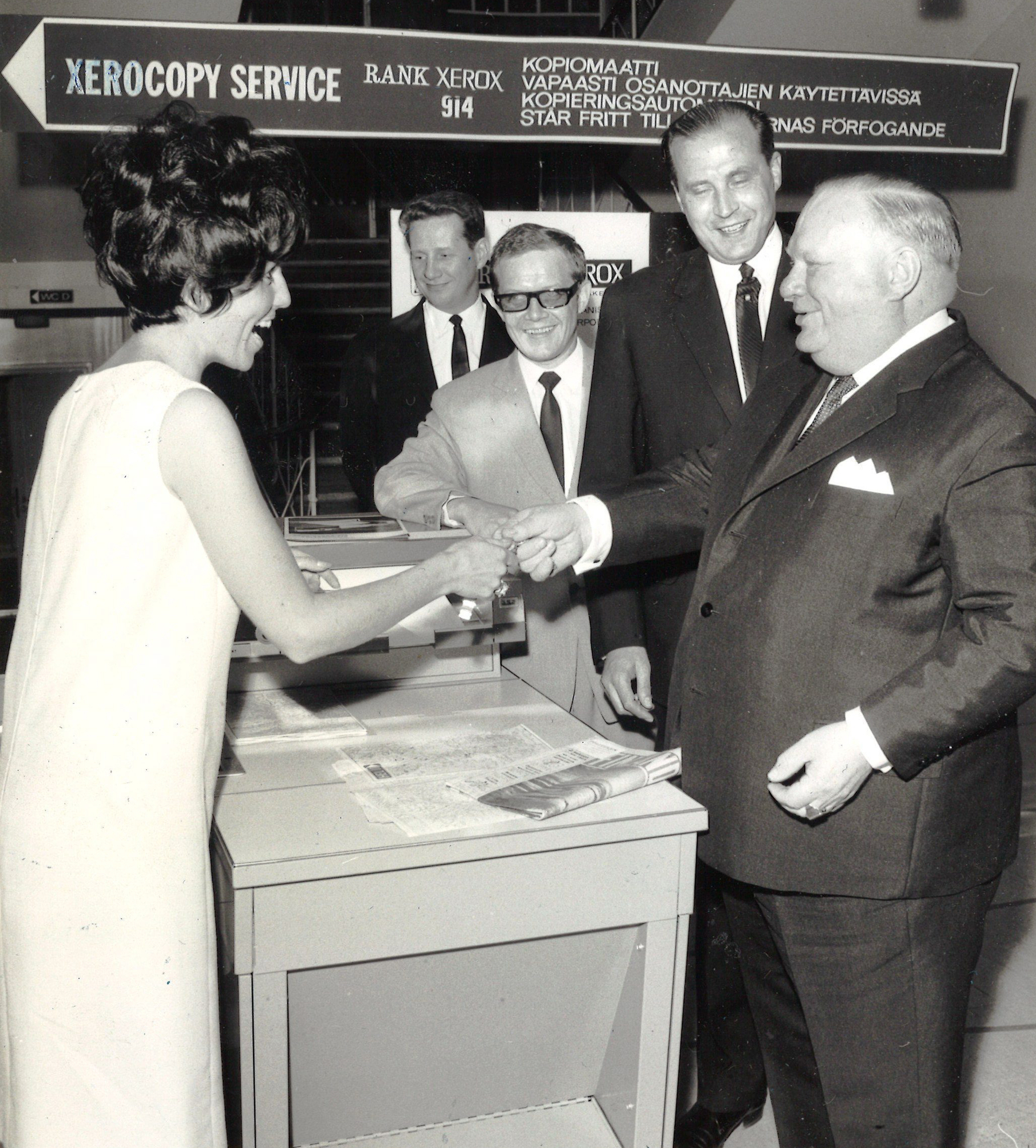
Xerox copying scene at a commercial conference in Finland, 1965

In the 1960s, Xerox held a dominant position in the photocopier market. In 1960, a xerography research facility called the Wilson Center for Research and Technology was opened in Webster, New York. In 1961, the company changed its name to Xerox. Xerox common stock (XRX) was listed on the New York Stock Exchange in 1961 and on the Chicago Stock Exchange in 1990.

In 1963, Xerox introduced the Xerox 813, the first desktop plain-paper copier, realizing Carlson's vision of a copier that could fit on anyone's office desk. Ten years later, in 1973, a basic, analogue, color copier, based on the 914, followed. The 914 itself was gradually sped up to become the 420 and 720. The 813 was similarly developed into the 330 and 660 products and, eventually, also the 740 desktop microfiche printer.

Xerox's first foray into duplicating, as distinct from copying, was with the Xerox 2400, introduced in 1966. The model number denoted the number of prints produced in an hour. Although not as fast as offset printing, this machine introduced the industry's first automatic document feeder, paper slitter and perforator, and collator (sorter). This product was soon sped up by fifty percent to become the Xerox 3600 Duplicator.

Meanwhile, a small lab team was borrowing copiers and modifying them. The lab was developing what it called long-distance xerography (LDX) to connect a modified 813 copier to a CRT-based scanner using a special service (TELPAK) of the public telephone network, so that a document scanned on one machine would print out on the other. The LDX system was introduced in 1964, followed in 1966 by the Magnafax Telecopier, a much smaller, slower, and less expensive version that acoustically coupled to a desk phone. However, fax machines would not become a truly mainstream device until the 1980s.

In 1968, C. Peter McColough, a longtime executive of Haloid and Xerox, became Xerox's CEO. The same year, the company consolidated its headquarters at Xerox Square in downtown Rochester, New York, with its 30-story Xerox Tower.

Xerox embarked on a series of acquisitions. It purchased University Microfilms International in 1962, Electro-Optical Systems in 1963, and R. R. Bowker in 1967. In 1969, Xerox acquired Scientific Data Systems (SDS), which it renamed the Xerox Data Systems (XDS) division and which produced the Sigma line and its successor XDS 5xx series of mainframe computers in the 1960s and 1970s. Xerox sold XDS to Honeywell in 1975.

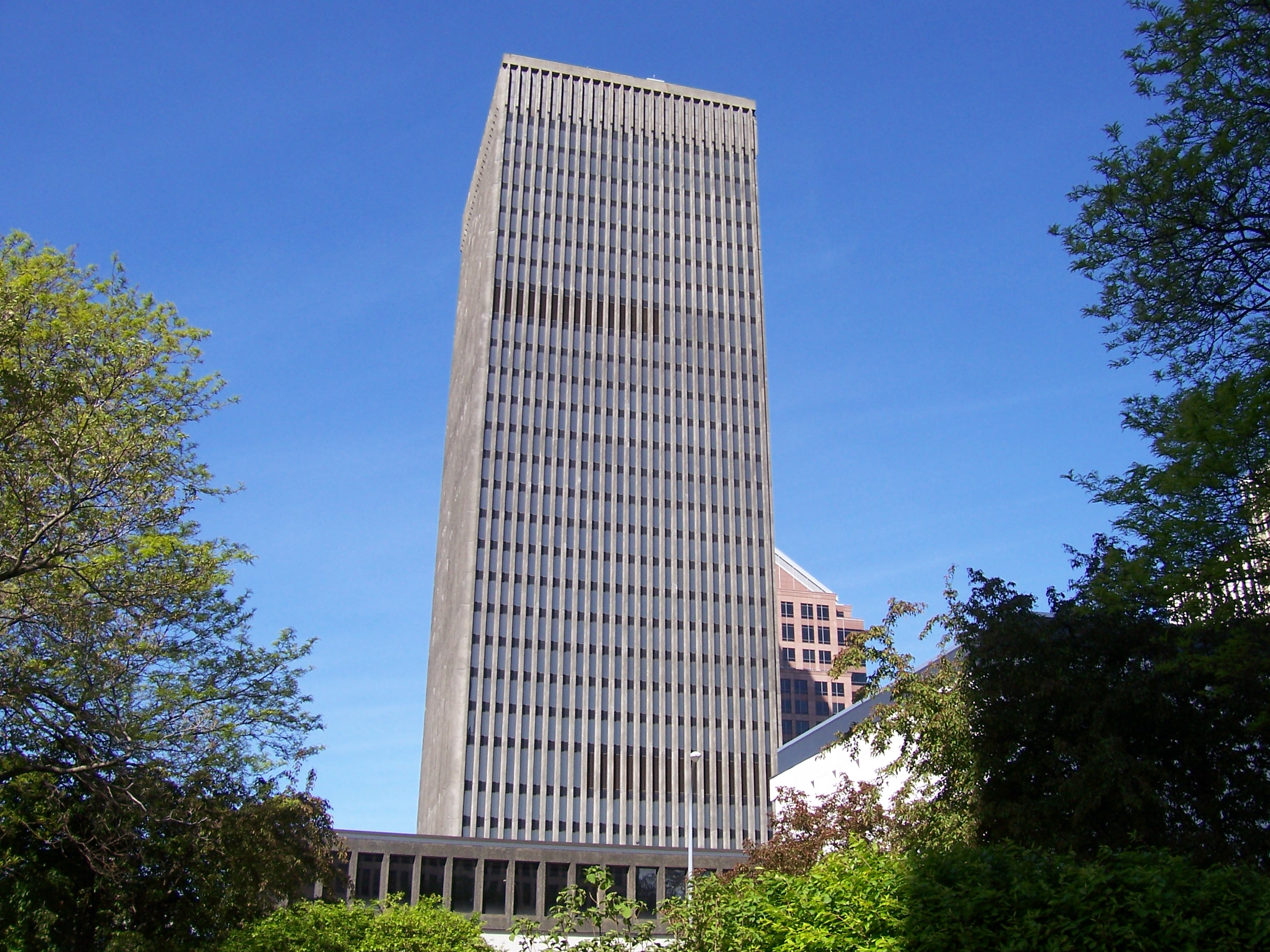
Xerox Tower in Rochester, New York, served as headquarters from 1968 to 1969.

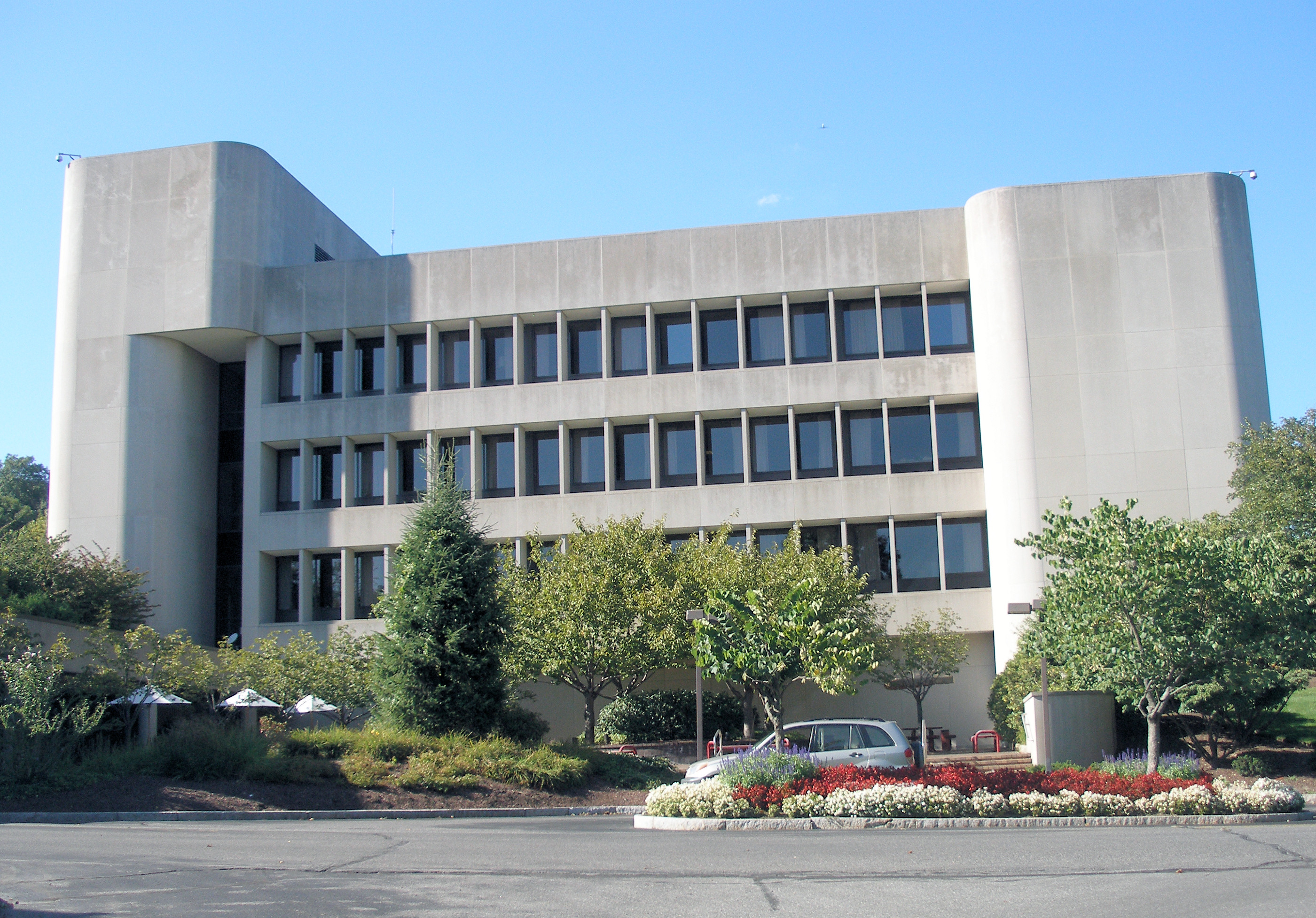
Stamford, Connecticut, served as headquarters from 1969 to 2007.

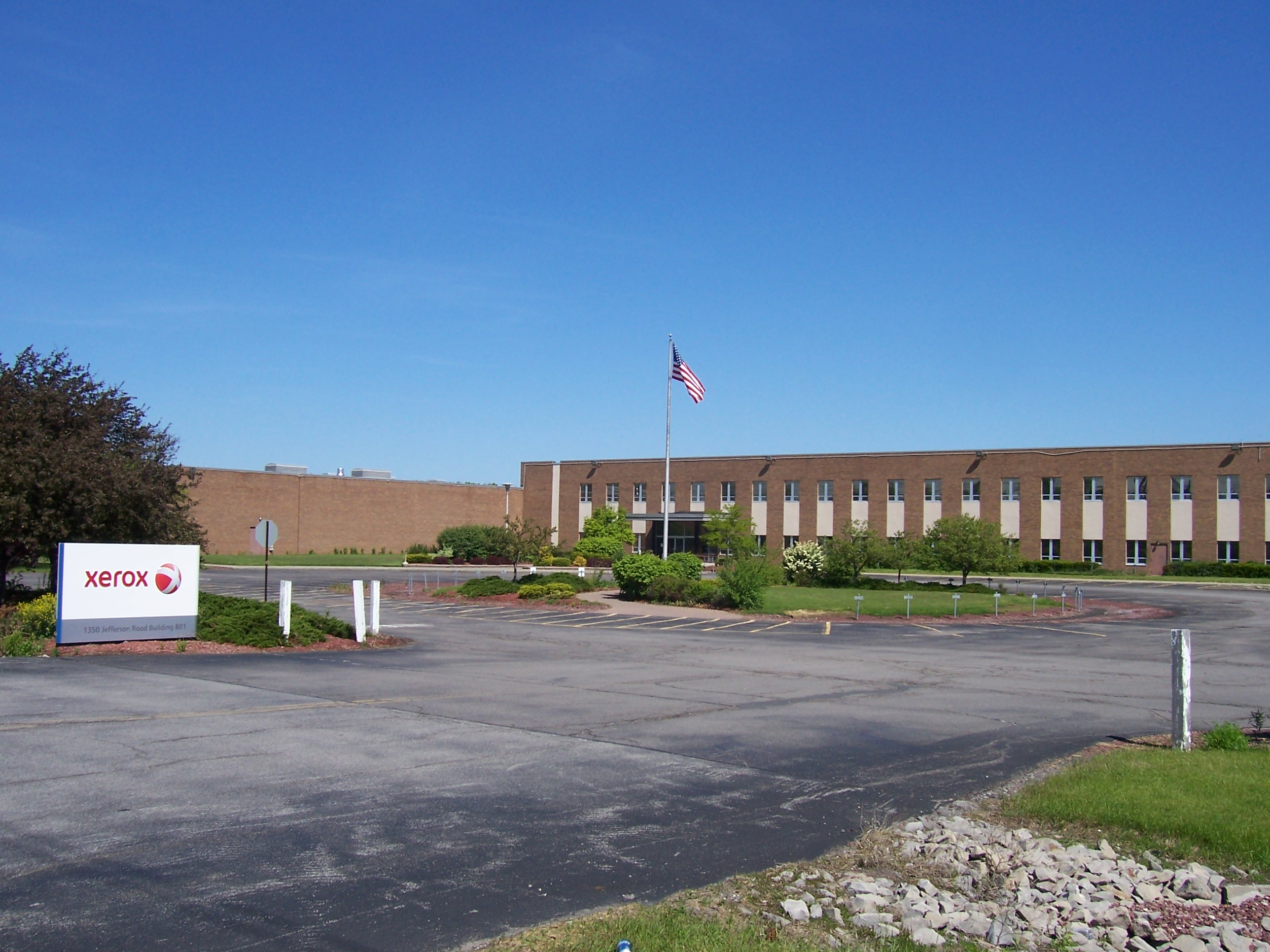
Former manufacturing facility in Henrietta, New York, constructed in the 1960s and sold to Harris RF Communications in 2010

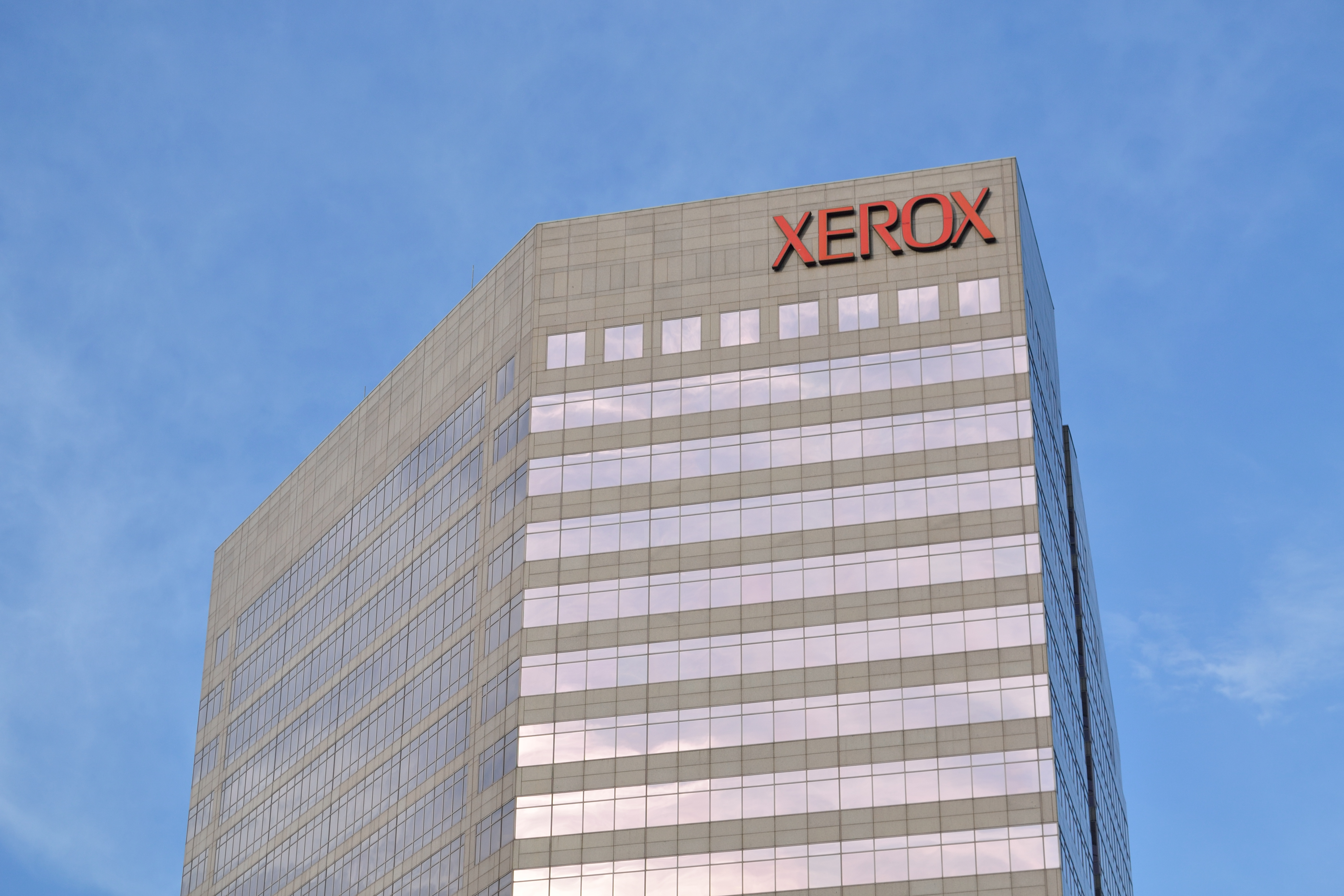
Xerox Canada Head Office at North American Life Centre (Xerox Tower), Toronto, Ontario

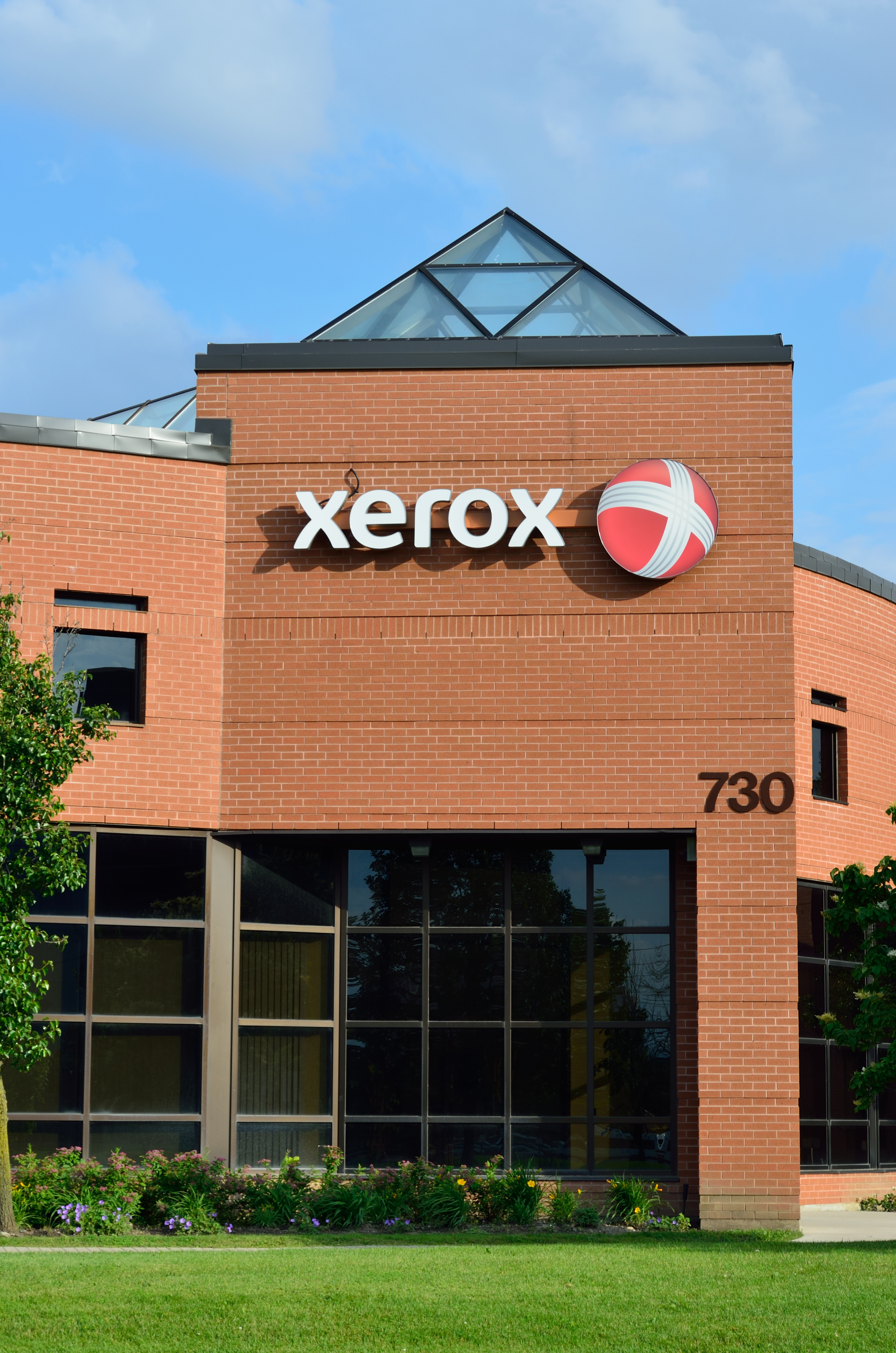
Xerox Training Center

=== 1970s ===
Archie McCardell was named president of the company in 1971. During his tenure, Xerox introduced the Xerox 6500, its first color copier. During McCardell's reign at Xerox, the company announced record revenues, earnings, and profits in 1973, 1974, and 1975. John Carrol became a backer, later spreading the company throughout North America.

In the mid-1970s, Xerox introduced the Xerox 9200 Duplicating System. Originally designed to be sold to print shops to increase their productivity, it was twice as fast as the 3600 duplicator at two impressions per second (7200 per hour). It was followed by the 9400, which did auto-duplexing, and then by the 9500, which added variable zoom reduction and electronic lightness/darkness control.

In a 1975 Super Bowl commercial for the 9200, Xerox debuted an advertising campaign featuring Brother Dominic, a monk who used the 9200 system to save decades of manual copying. Before it was aired, there was some concern that the commercial would be denounced as blasphemous. However, when the commercial was screened for the Archbishop of New York, he found it amusing and gave it his blessing. Dominic, portrayed by Jack Eagle, became the face of Xerox into the 1980s.

The 6500 color copier was introduced in May 1973.

Following these years of record profits, in 1975, Xerox resolved an antitrust suit with the United States Federal Trade Commission (FTC), which at the time was under the direction of Frederic M. Scherer. The Xerox consent decree required it to license its entire patent portfolio, mainly to Japanese competitors. Within four years of the consent decree, Xerox's share of the U.S. copier market dropped from nearly 100% to less than 14%.

In 1979, Xerox purchased Western Union International (WUI) as the basis for its proposed Xerox Telecommunications Network (XTEN) for local-loop communications. However, after three years, in 1982, the company decided the idea was a mistake and sold its assets to MCI at a loss.

=== 1980s ===
David T. Kearns, a Xerox executive since 1971, took over as CEO in 1982. The company was revived in the 1980s and 1990s through improvement in quality design and realignment of its product line. Attempting to expand beyond copiers, in 1981 Xerox introduced a line of electronic memory typewriters, the Memorywriter, which gained 20% market share, mostly at the expense of IBM.

In 1980, Xerox acquired Kurzweil Computer Products, a pioneering manufacturer of flatbed scanners, from Ray Kurzweil. It later acquired Datacopy, another pioneer in the image scanner market, for $31 million in 1986.

In 1983, Xerox bought Crum & Forster, an insurance company, and formed Xerox Financial Services (XFS) in 1984.

In 1985, Xerox sold all of its publishing subsidiaries, including University Microfilms and R. R. Bowker.

In 1989, Xerox won the Malcolm Baldrige National Quality Award for Business Products and Systems.

=== 1990s ===
Xerox "Pixelated X" logo used from 1994 to 2008

In 1990, Paul Allaire, a Xerox executive since 1966, succeeded David Kearns, who had reached mandatory retirement age. Allaire disentangled Xerox from the financial services industry.

The development of digital photocopiers in the 1990s and a revamp of the entire product range again gave Xerox a technical lead over its competitors. In 1990, Xerox released the DocuTech Production Publisher Model 135, ushering in print-on-demand. Digital photocopiers were essentially high-end laser printers with integrated scanners. Soon, additional features such as network printing and faxing were added to many models, known as multi-function machines, or just MFMs, which could be attached to computer networks. Xerox worked to turn its product into a service, providing a complete document service to companies, including supply, maintenance, configuration, and user support.

To reinforce this image, the company introduced a corporate signature in 1994, The Document Company, above its main logo, and introduced a red digital X. The digital X symbolized the transition of documents between the paper and digital worlds.

In April 1999, Allaire was succeeded by Richard Thoman, who had been brought in from IBM in 1997 as president. The first “outsider” to head Xerox, Thoman resigned in 2000.

=== 2000s ===
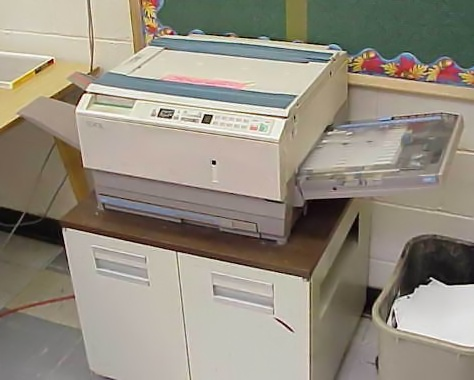
A small, much-used Xerox photocopier at an American high school, 2004

After Thoman's resignation, Allaire again resumed the position of CEO and served until the appointment of Anne M. Mulcahy, another long-term Xerox executive. Xerox's turnaround was largely led by Mulcahy, who was appointed president in May 2000, CEO in August 2001, and chairman in January 2002. She launched an aggressive turnaround plan that returned Xerox to full-year profitability by the end of 2002, along with decreasing debt, increasing cash, and continuing to invest in research and development.

In 2000, Xerox acquired Tektronix color printing and imaging division in Wilsonville, Oregon, for US$925 million. This led to the current Xerox Phaser line of products as well as Xerox solid ink printing technology.

In September 2004, Xerox celebrated the 45th anniversary of the Xerox 914. More than 200,000 units were made around the world between 1959 and 1976, the year production of the 914 was stopped. Today, the 914 is part of American history as an artifact in the Smithsonian Institution.

In November 2006, Xerox completed the acquisition of XMPie. XMPie, a provider of software for cross-media, variable data one-to-one marketing, was the first acquisition of Xerox to remain an independent entity, as a Xerox company and not a division, and to this day is led by its original founder Jacob Aizikowitz.

Xerox headquarters moved from Stamford, Connecticut, to Norwalk in October 2007.

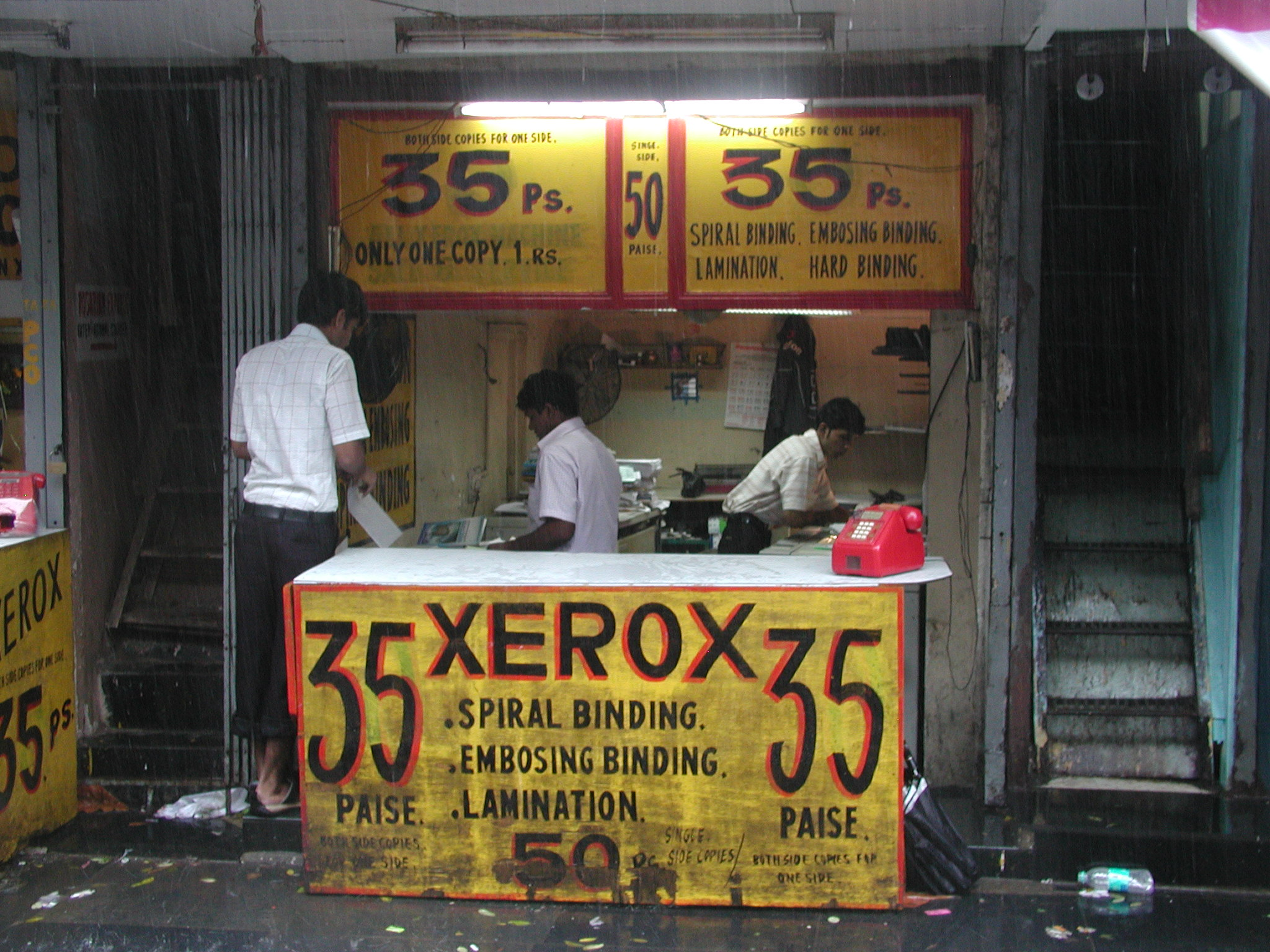
Street stand in India offering Xerox services, 2007

In October 2008, Xerox Canada was named one of Greater Toronto's Top Employers by Mediacorp Canada, announced by the Toronto Star.

On July 1, 2009, Ursula Burns succeeded Anne Mulcahy as CEO of Xerox. Burns was the first African American woman to head a company of that size.

On September 28, 2009, Xerox announced the intended acquisition of Affiliated Computer Services, a services and outsourcing company, for $6.4 billion. The acquisition was completed in February 2010. Xerox said it paid 4.935 Xerox shares and $18.60 cash for each share of ACS, totaling $6.4 billion, or $63.11 a share for the company.

=== 2010s ===
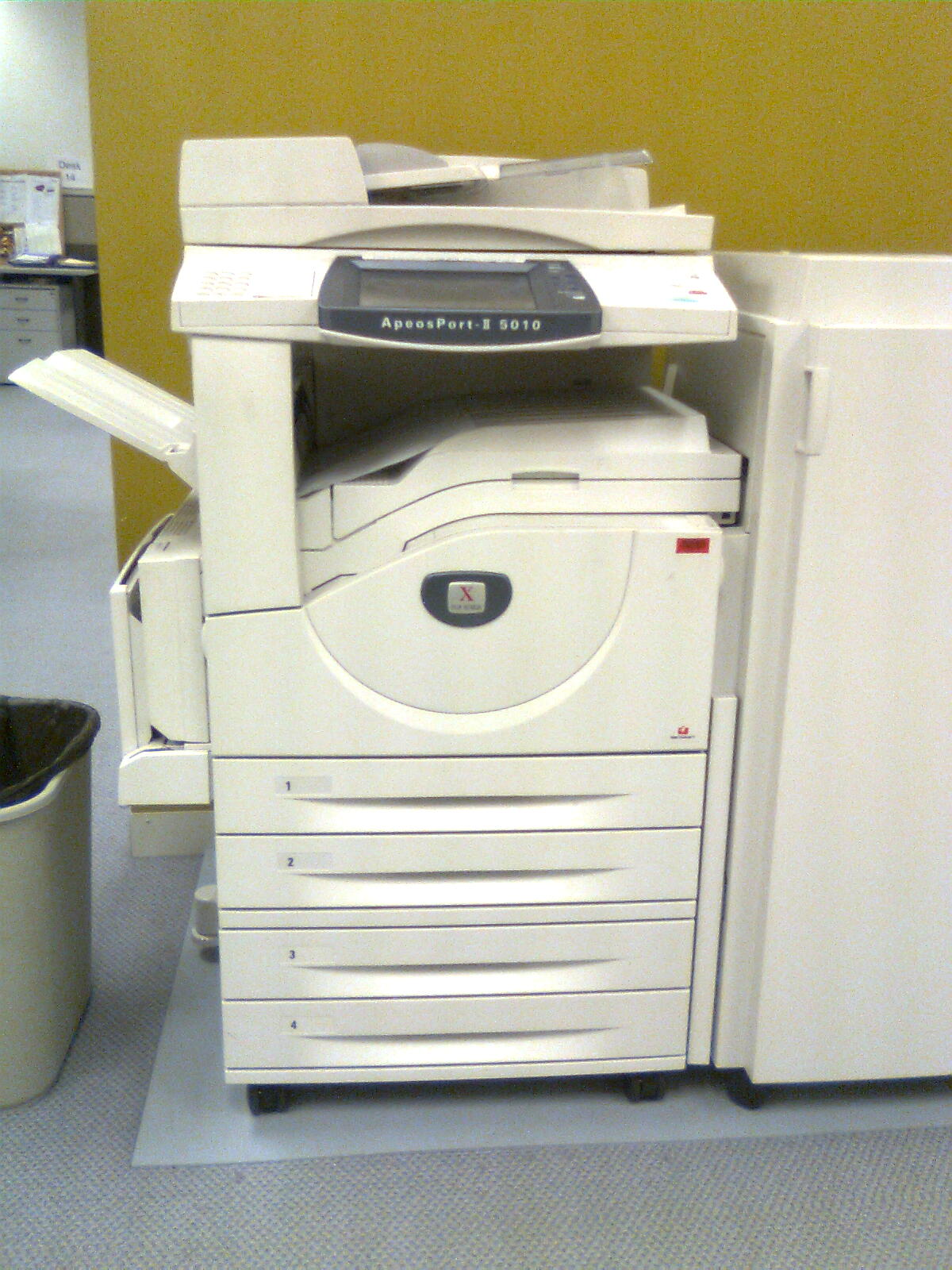
Fuji Xerox ApeosPort-II5010 photocopier in Mauritania, 2011

In May 2011, Xerox acquired NewField IT for an undisclosed sum.

In December 2013, Xerox sold its Wilsonville, Oregon solid ink product design, engineering and chemistry group and related assets previously acquired from Tektronix to 3D Systems for $32.5 million in cash.

In December 2014, Xerox sold the IT outsourcing business it had acquired in 2009 from Affiliated Computer Services to Atos for $1.05 billion. This move was taken due to the relatively slow growth of this business relative to some other Xerox units.

In January 2016, Xerox—reportedly under pressure from activist shareholder and corporate raider Carl Icahn—announced that by the end of the year it would spin off its business services unit, largely made up of Affiliated Computer Services, into its own publicly traded company. The name and management of the new company had not been determined at the time of the announcement. Icahn would appoint three members of the new company's board of directors, and he would choose a person to advise its search for a CEO. In June, the company announced that the document management business would retain the name Xerox and the new business services company would be named Conduent. It also announced that Ashok Vemuri would serve as Conduent's CEO and that Icahn would control three seats on the new company's board. It continued to seek a CEO for Xerox; in May, Burns announced her intention to step down as CEO but continue as chairman of the document management business. In June 2016, the company announced that Jeff Jacobson would become the new CEO following the completion of the company's planned separation. This became effective in January 2017.

On January 31, 2018, Xerox announced that Fujifilm had agreed to acquire a 50.1% controlling stake in the company for US$6.1 billion, which was to be combined into their existing joint venture Fuji Xerox (having a value of $18 billion post-acquisition).

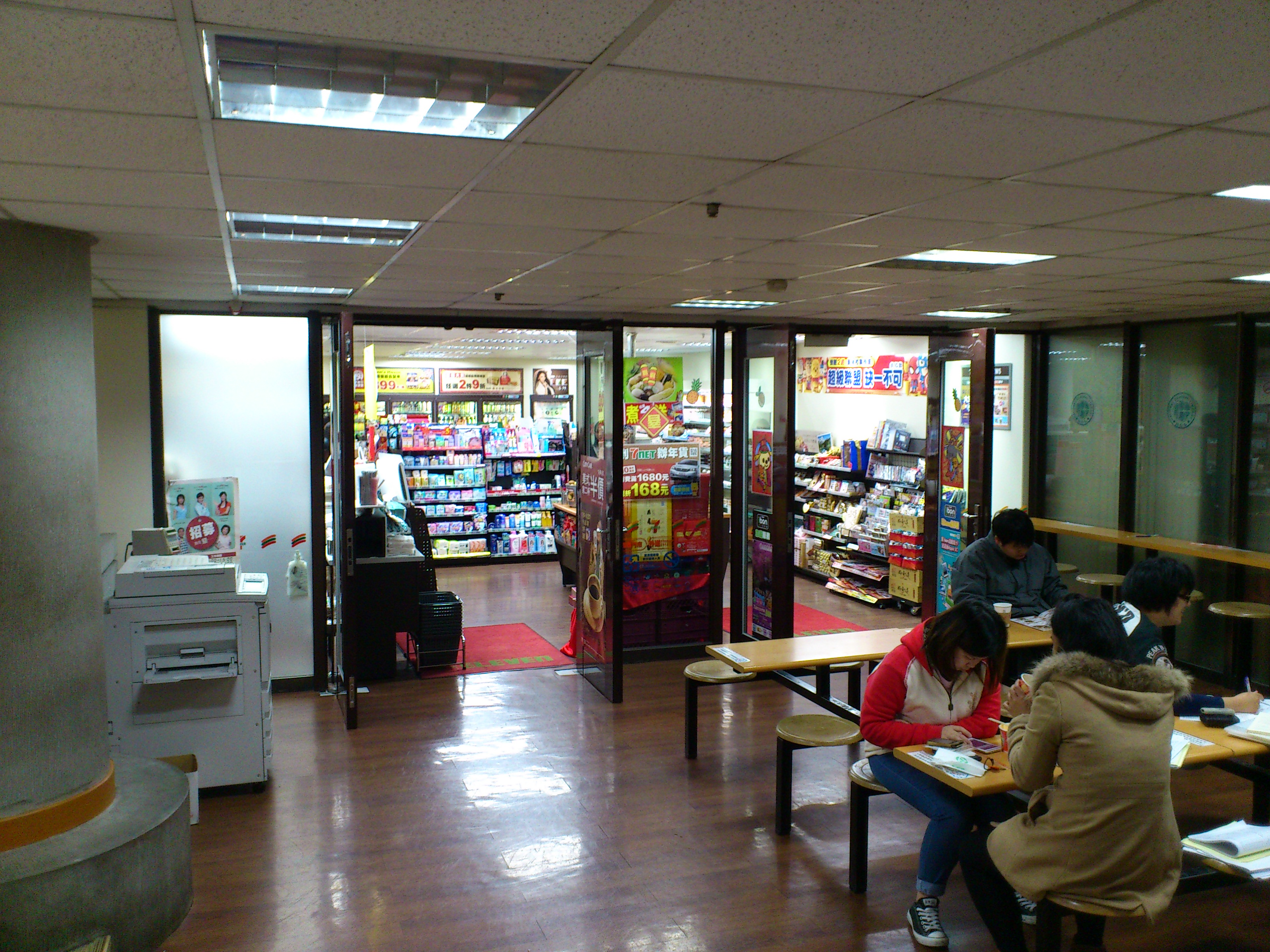
Fuji Xerox Document Centre 505 at a 7-Eleven store in Taiwan, 2013

On May 1, 2018, it was announced that chairman Robert Keegan and CEO Jeff Jacobson and four other directors would resign as part of a deal with investors Carl Icahn and Darwin Deason, who had mounted a proxy fight to oppose the Fujifilm deal. On May 4, Xerox backed away from the deal after stipulations about ceasing litigation were not met. Icahn and Deason responded with an open letter to shareholders blaming the board and management. On May 13, a new deal was reached that additionally canceled the Fujifilm transaction.

In November 2019, Xerox began to pursue a hostile takeover of PC and printer manufacturer HP, declaring its intent to “engage directly” with shareholders after HP rejected two unsolicited bids for the company. Xerox stated in January 2020 that it would pursue the replacement of HP's board. HP criticized the proposed purchase as a "flawed value exchange” based on “overstated synergies”, and instituted a shareholder rights plan and other measures designed to quell the bid, which the company believed was being orchestrated by Icahn.

=== 2020s ===
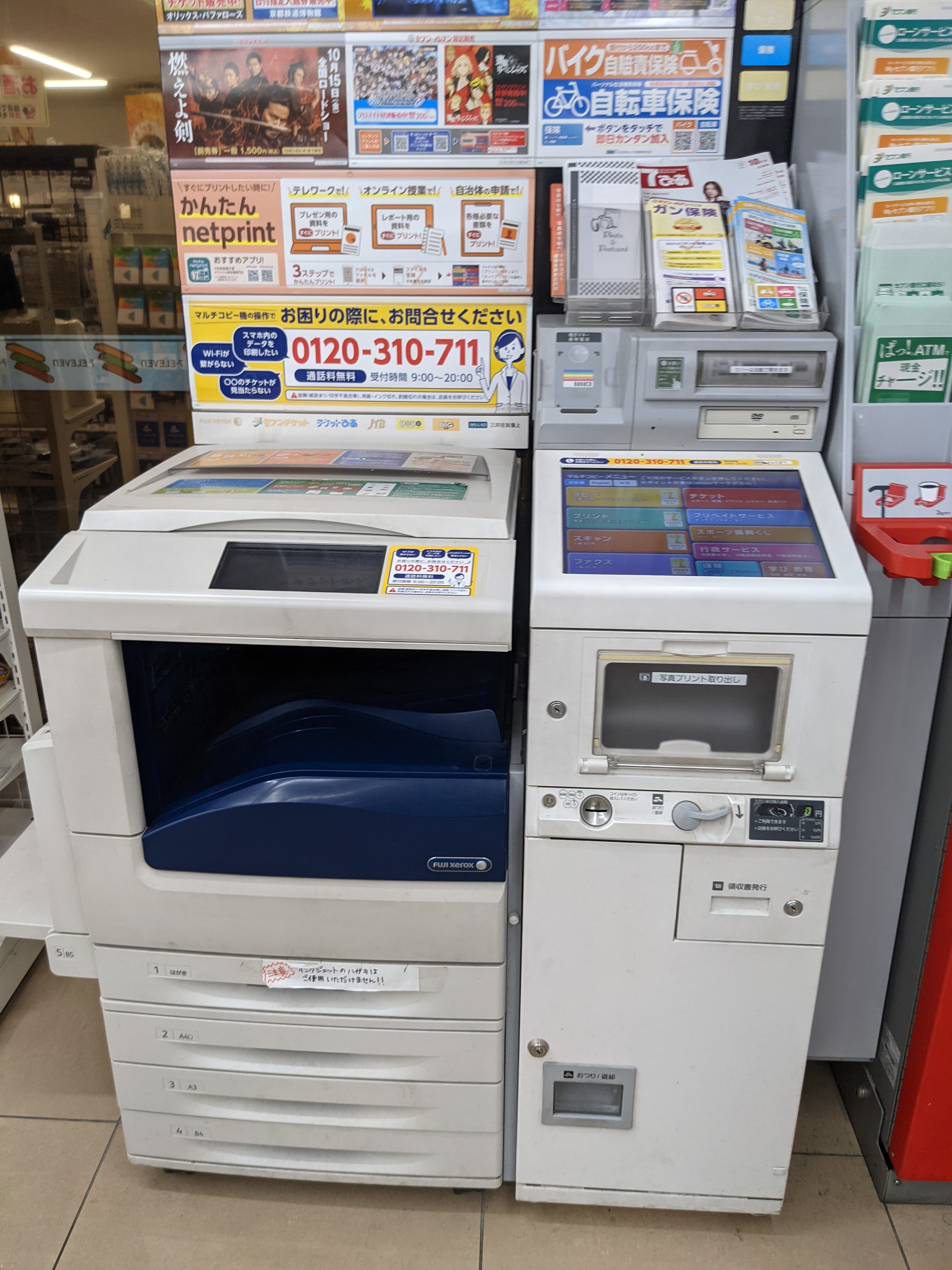
Fuji Xerox multicopy printer available for use in Japan, 2021

In February 2020, Xerox announced the hiring of Tali Rosman as VP of Xerox's 3D business. She joined Xerox from NiCE, where she was vice president and head of business operations for the Americas. She would report to CTO Naresh Shanker.

On March 5, HP revealed that its board of directors had unanimously declined Xerox's $24-a-share cash-and-stock offer.

On March 13, Xerox revealed that it was putting its campaign to acquire HP on hold by postponing additional presentations, interviews with the press, and meetings with HP shareholders. Xerox vice chairman and chief executive John Visentin cited the COVID-19 pandemic as a main reason and said, “In light of the escalating COVID-19 pandemic, Xerox needs to prioritize the health and safety of its employees, customers, partners, and affiliates over and above all considerations, including its proposal to acquire HP.”

On March 31, 2020, Xerox canceled its $24-a-share offer.

In September 2020, Xerox opened its North Carolina Center of Excellence in Cary, North Carolina. The center includes the research and development operations, the 3D printing lab, and the Xerox Digital eXperience IT organization.

In September 2021, Xerox announced it was transferring its stock ticker from the New York Stock Exchange to the Nasdaq after 60 years. The transfer went into effect on September 21, 2021.

In December 2024, Xerox announced an agreement to acquire Lexmark International, a Chinese-owned maker of printers and printing software based in Lexington, Kentucky, in a $1.5 billion deal. The acquisition was completed on July 2, 2025.

=== Digital printing ===
The laser printer was invented in 1969 by Xerox researcher Gary Starkweather, who modified a Xerox 7000 copier. Xerox management was afraid the product version of Starkweather's invention, which became the 9700, would negatively affect its copier business, so the innovation sat in limbo until IBM launched the 3800 laser printer in 1976.

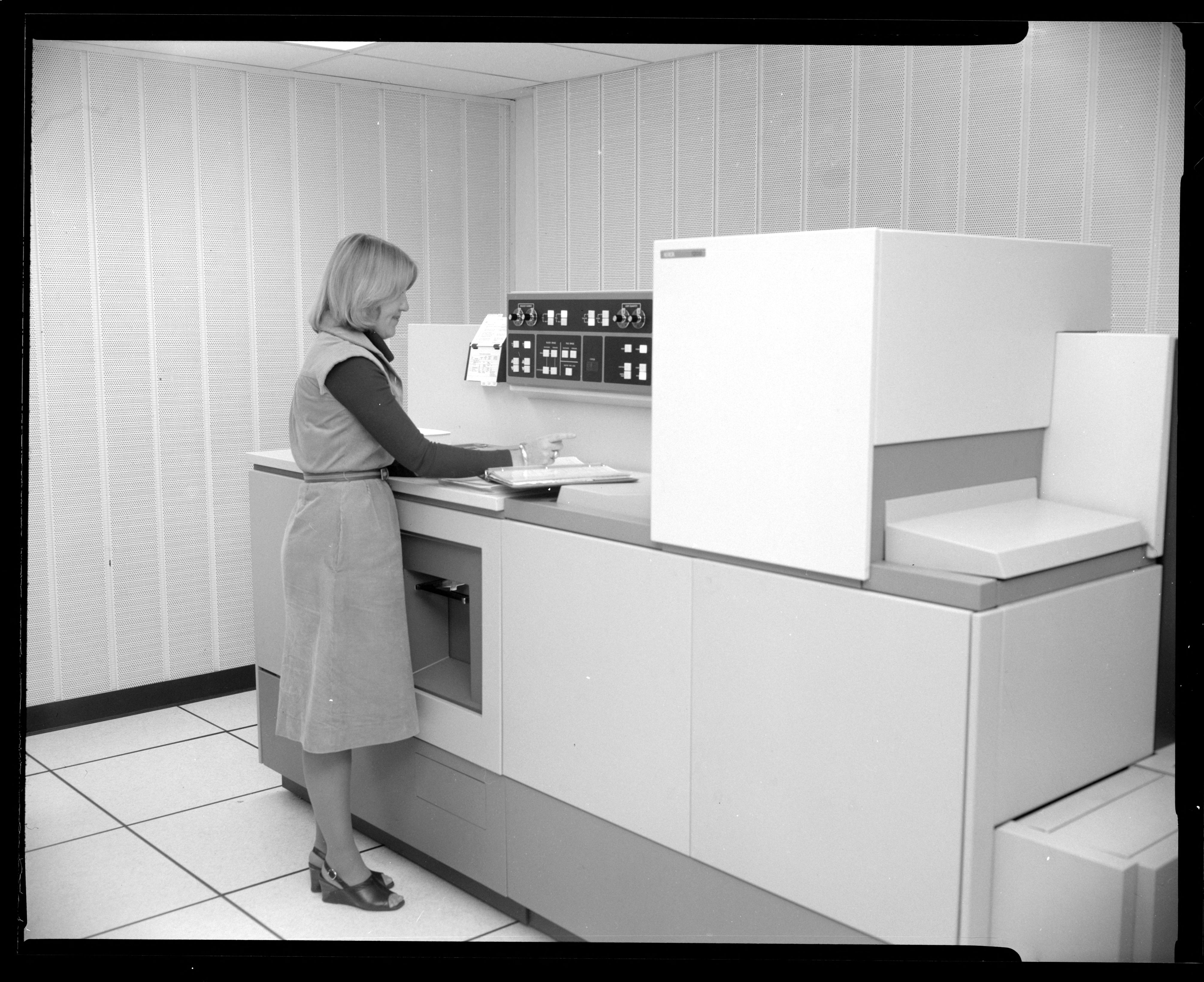
Xerox 1200 Computer Printing System

The first commercial non-impact printer was the Xerox 1200, introduced in 1973, based on the 3600 copier. It had an optical character generator designed by optical engineer Phil Chen. It was used in mainframe computer environments for large-volume printing for business applications.

In 1977, after IBM had produced the first laser printer, Xerox introduced the Xerox 9700. It was also used in mainframe environments and could handle even larger amounts of paper and printing. Laser printing eventually became a multibillion-dollar business for Xerox.

In the late 1970s, Xerox introduced the Xerox 350 color slide machine. This product allowed the customer to create digital word and graphic 35-millimeter slides. Many of the concepts used in today's photo editing programs were pioneered with this technology.

In 1980, Xerox announced the 5700 laser printer, a much smaller version of its 9700, but with touch-screen capabilities and multiple media input (word-processing disks, IBM magcards, etc.) and printer 'finishing' options. This product was allegedly never intended to enter commercial markets due to its development cost, but rather to show the innovation of Xerox. It took off with many customers but was soon replaced with the smaller and lower-cost Xerox 2700 Distributed Electronic Printer offering in 1982.

=== Palo Alto Research Center ===
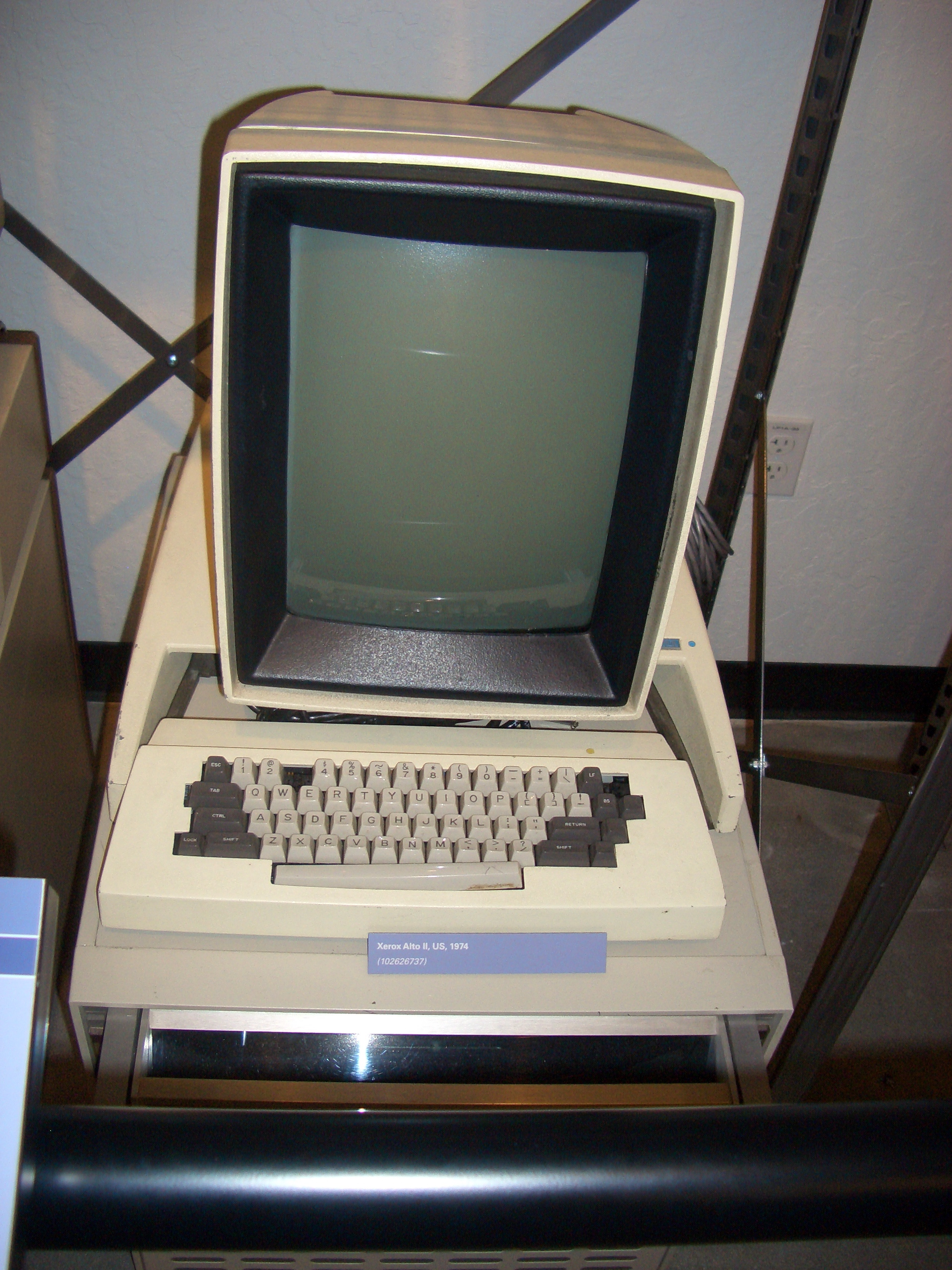
The Xerox Alto workstation was developed at Xerox PARC.

In 1970, under company president C. Peter McColough, Xerox opened the Xerox Palo Alto Research Center, known as Xerox PARC. The facility developed many modern computing technologies such as the graphical user interface (GUI), laser printing, WYSIWYG text editors, and Ethernet. From these inventions, Xerox PARC created the Xerox Alto in 1973, a small minicomputer similar to a modern workstation or personal computer. This machine can be considered the first personal computer, given its versatile combination of a cathode-ray-type screen, a mouse-type pointing device, and a QWERTY-type alphanumeric keyboard. But the Alto was never commercially sold, as Xerox could not see its commercial potential. It was, however, installed in Xerox's own offices worldwide and those of the US Government and military, who could see the potential. Within these sites, the individual workstations were connected by a Xerox PARC-developed Local Area Network (LAN) technology, Ethernet, which is ubiquitous in computing even to this day. Data was sent around this system of heavy, yellow, low-loss coaxial cable using the packet data system. In addition, PARC also developed one of the earliest internetworking protocol suites, the PARC Universal Packet (PUP).

In 1979, Steve Jobs made a deal with Xerox's venture capital division: he would let them invest US$1 million (equivalent to $4.44 million in 2025) in exchange for the technology they were working on. Jobs and the others saw the commercial potential of the WIMP (Window, Icon, Menu, and Pointing device) system and redirected development of the Apple Lisa to incorporate these technologies. Jobs was quoted as saying, “They just had no idea what they had.”

In 1980, Jobs invited several key PARC researchers to join his company so that they could fully develop and implement their ideas.

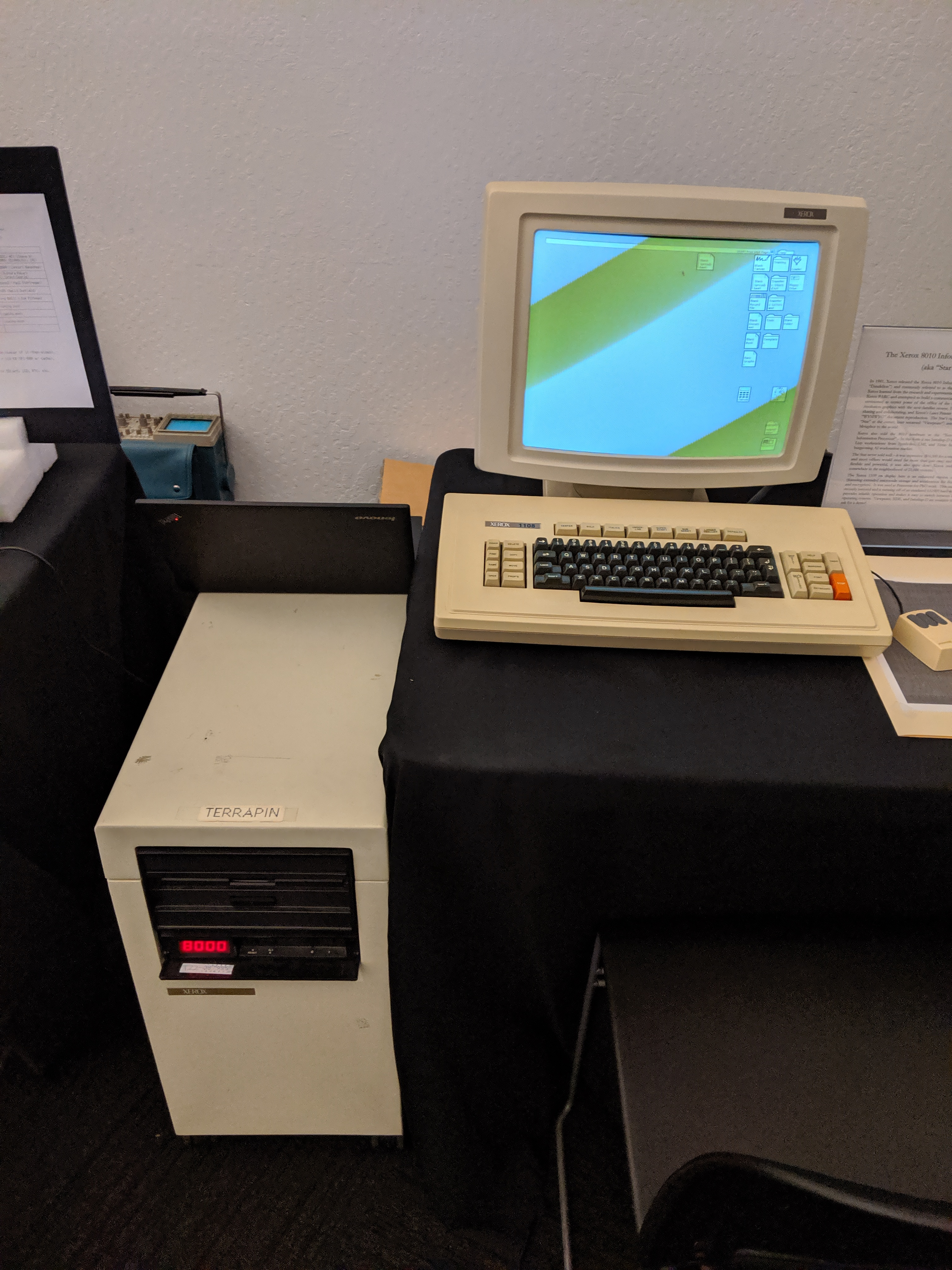
The Xerox Star 8010

In 1981, Xerox released a system similar to the Alto, the Xerox Star. It was the first commercial system to incorporate technologies that have subsequently become commonplace in personal computers, such as a bitmapped display, window-based GUI, mouse, Ethernet networking, file servers, print servers, and e-mail. The Xerox Star and its successor, the Xerox Daybreak, despite their technological breakthroughs, did not sell well due to their high price, retailing at US$16,000 per unit (equivalent to $57,000 in 2025). A typical Xerox Star-based office, complete with a network and printers, would have cost US$100,000 (equivalent to $354,000 in 2025).

In the mid-1980s, Apple considered buying Xerox; however, a deal was never reached. Apple instead bought rights to the Alto GUI and adapted it into a more affordable personal computer aimed at business and education markets. The Apple Macintosh was released in 1984, and it was the first personal computer to popularize the GUI and mouse among the public.

In 2002, PARC was spun off into an independent wholly owned subsidiary of Xerox.

In April 2023, Xerox announced that it would donate the lab and its related assets to SRI International. As part of the deal, Xerox would keep most of the patent rights inside PARC, and benefit from a preferred research agreement with SRI/PARC.

== Chief executives ==
Chief executives
Name	Title	Tenure	Photo
George C. Seager	President	1906–1912	
Gilbert E. Mosher	President	1912–1938	
Joseph R. Wilson	President	1938–1946	
Joseph C. Wilson	President; CEO	1946–1966; 1961–1967	
C. Peter McColough	CEO	1968–1982	
David T. Kearns	CEO	1982 – July 31, 1990	
Paul A. Allaire	CEO	August 1, 1990 – April 6, 1999	
G. Richard Thoman	CEO	April 7, 1999 – May 10, 2000	
Paul A. Allaire	CEO	May 11, 2000 – July 31, 2001	
Anne M. Mulcahy	CEO	August 1, 2001 – June 30, 2009	
Ursula Burns	CEO	July 1, 2009 – December 31, 2016	
Jeff Jacobson	CEO	January 1, 2017 – May 15, 2018	
John Visentin	CEO and Vice Chairman	May 16, 2018 – June 28, 2022	
Steve Bandrowczak	CEO and Vice Chairman	June 29, 2022 – March 29, 2026	
Louie Pastor	CEO	March 30, 2026 – present	

== Products and services ==
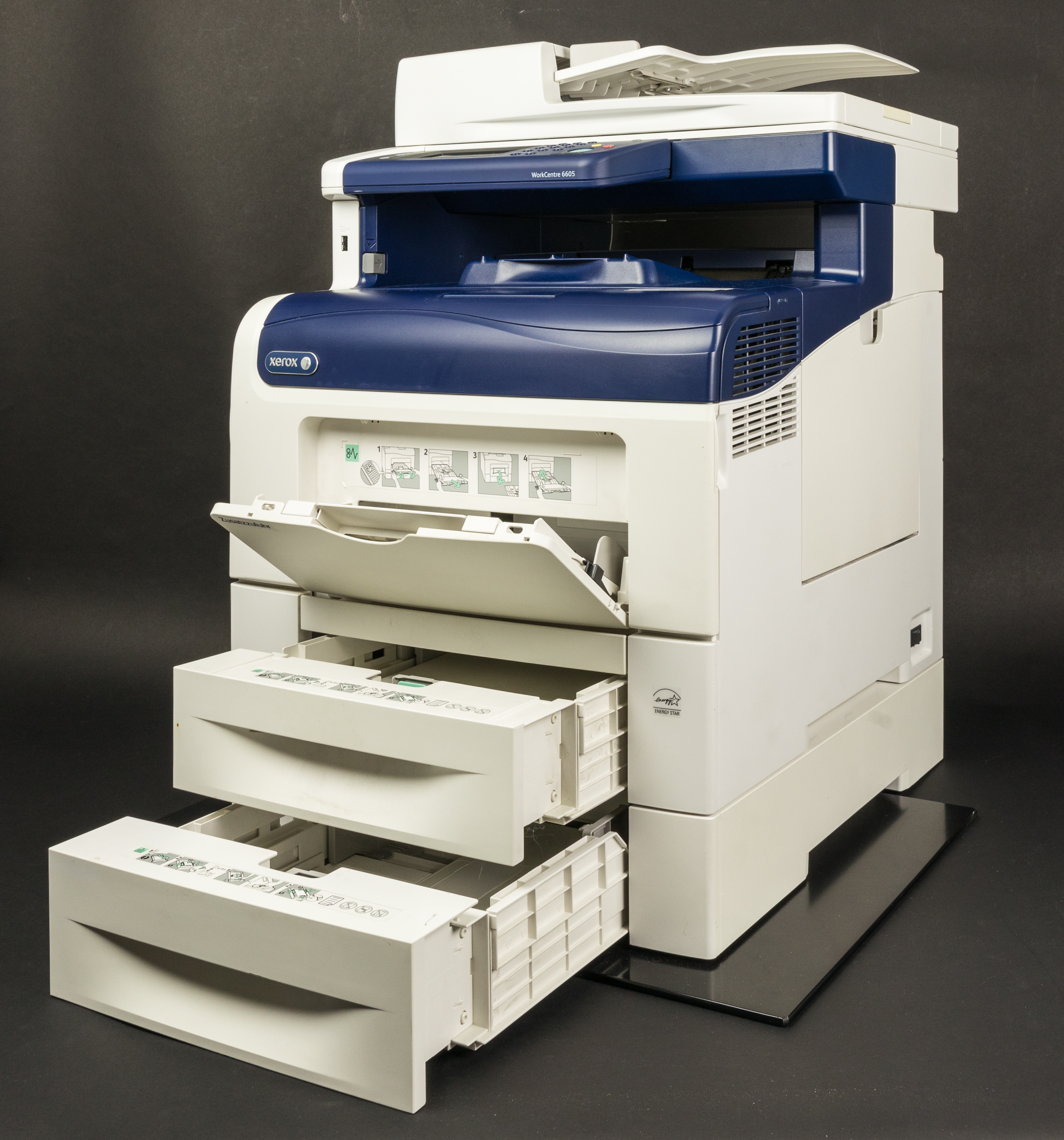
Xerox WorkCentre 6605

Xerox manufactures and sells office equipment, including scanners, printers, and multifunction systems that scan, print, copy, email, and fax. These model families include WorkCentre, Phaser, and ColorQube. For the graphic communications and commercial print industries, the Xerox product portfolio includes high-volume digital printing presses, production printers, and wide-format printers that use xerographic and inkjet printing technologies. Products include the iGen, Nuvera, DocuPrint, and Impika series, as well as the Trivor, iPrint, and Rialto (inkjet) machines.

== Corporate structure ==
Xerox logo 1968–2008, designed by Chermayeff & Geismar

Although Xerox is a global brand, it maintained a joint venture from 1962 to 2021, Fuji Xerox, with Japanese photographic firm Fuji Photo Film Co. to develop, produce, and sell in the Asia-Pacific region. Fujifilm announced in January 2020 that it would not renew its technology agreement with Xerox, and Fuji Xerox was renamed Fujifilm Business Innovation in April 2021.

Xerox India, formerly Modi Xerox, is Xerox's Indian subsidiary derived from a joint venture formed between Dr. Bhupendra Kumar Modi and Rank Xerox in 1983. Xerox obtained a majority stake in 1999 and aims to buy out the remaining shareholders.

NewField IT is a wholly owned subsidiary of Xerox that implements and supports third-party software for MPS providers.

=== Rank Xerox ===
Rank Xerox logo used in 1980s

The European company Rank Xerox, originally a joint venture between Xerox and the British company The Rank Organisation, later extended to Asia and Africa, has been fully owned by Xerox since 1997. The Rank Xerox name was discontinued following the buyout, and the Rank Xerox Research Centre was renamed the Xerox Research Centre Europe. The laboratory, based in France, was acquired by South Korean IT company Naver in 2017, and later became Naver Labs Europe.

== Sponsorship ==
Xerox now sponsors the Factory Ducati Team in the World Superbike Championship, under the name of the “Xerox Ducati”.

In November 2024, Aston Martin F1 Team announced a partnership with Xerox commencing in 2025.

Xerox was a long-standing partner of the Olympic Movement, with a relationship dating back to 1964. The company's top-tier worldwide sponsorship as the exclusive provider of document publishing systems began in 1994 and concluded after the 2004 Athens Games.

== Accounting irregularities ==
On May 31, 2001, Xerox announced that its auditors, KPMG, had certified Xerox's financial statements for the three years ended December 31, 2000; the financials included some restatements. On March 31, 2002, Xerox restated its financials, which reflected the reallocation of equipment sales revenue of more than $2 billion. On April 11, 2002, the U.S. Securities and Exchange Commission filed a complaint against Xerox. The complaint alleged Xerox deceived the public between 1997 and 2000 by employing several “accounting maneuvers”, the most significant of which was a change in which Xerox recorded revenue from copy machine leases – recognizing a “sale” when a lease contract was signed, instead of recognizing revenue over the entire length of the contract. At issue was when the revenue was recognized, not the validity of the revenue. Xerox's restatement only changed what year the revenue was recognized. On December 20, 2002, Xerox Corporation reported that it had discovered an error in the calculation of its non-cash interest expense related to a debt instrument and associated interest rate swap agreements, resulting in an after-tax understatement of interest expense of approximately $5 million to $6 million, or less than 1 cent per share in each of the four quarters of 2001 and for the first three quarters of 2002.

In response to the SEC's complaint, Xerox neither admitted nor denied wrongdoing. It agreed to pay a $10 million penalty and to restate its financial results for the years 1997 through 2000. On June 5, 2003, six Xerox senior executives accused of securities fraud settled their issues with the SEC and neither admitted nor denied wrongdoing. They agreed to pay $22 million in penalties, disgorgement, and interest. The company received approval to settle the securities lawsuit in 2008.

On January 29, 2003, the SEC filed a complaint against Xerox's auditors, KPMG, alleging four partners in the “Big Five” accounting firm permitted Xerox to “cook the books” to fill a $3 billion “gap” in revenue and a $1.4 billion “gap” in pre-tax earnings. In April 2005, KPMG settled with the SEC by paying a US$22.48 million fine. Meanwhile, Xerox paid a civil penalty of $10 million. As part of the settlement, KPMG neither admits nor denies wrongdoing.

During a settlement with the Securities and Exchange Commission, Xerox began to revamp itself once more. As a symbol of this transformation, the relative size of the word “Xerox” was increased proportionally to “The Document Company” on the corporate signature, and the latter was dropped altogether in September 2004, along with the digital X. However, Fuji Xerox used the digital X and “The Document Company” until April 2008.

== Character substitution bug ==
In 2013, German computer scientist David Kriesel discovered an error in a Xerox WorkCentre 7535 copier. The device would substitute number digits in scanned documents, even when OCR was turned off. For instance, a cost table in a scanned document had an entry of 85.40, instead of the original sum of 65.40. After unsuccessfully trying to resolve this issue with Xerox's customer support, he publicized his findings on his blog. Providing example pages that would lead to the bug occurring, it was confirmed that this bug was reproducible on a wide variety of Xerox WorkCentre and other high-end Xerox copiers.

The source of the error was a bug in the JBIG2 implementation, an image compression standard that uses pattern matching to encode identical characters only once. While this provides a high level of compression, it is susceptible to errors in identifying similar characters.

A possible workaround was published by Kriesel, which involved setting the image quality from “normal” to “higher” or “high.” Shortly afterward, it was found that the same fix had been suggested in the printer manual, which mentioned the occurrence of character substitutions in “normal mode”, indicating that Xerox was aware of the software error. In Xerox's initial response to growing media interest, the error was described as occurring rarely and only when factory settings had been changed. After Kriesel provided evidence that the error was also occurring in all three image quality modes (normal, higher, and high), including the factory defaults, Xerox corrected its statement and released a software patch to eliminate the problem. Despite the problem being present in some instances also in higher quality mode, Xerox advises users that they can use this mode as an alternative to applying the patch.

== Trademark ==
The word “Xerox” is used as a synonym for photocopy (both as a noun and a verb) in many areas; for example, “I xeroxed the document and placed it on your desk” and “Please make a xeroxed copy of the articles and hand them out a week before the exam.” Though both are common, the company does not condone such uses of its trademark and is particularly concerned about the ongoing use of “Xerox” as a verb, as this places the trademark in danger of being declared a generic word by the courts. The company is engaged in an ongoing advertising and media campaign to convince the public that Xerox should not be used as a verb.

To this end, the company has written to publications that have used Xerox as a verb. It has also purchased print advertisements using “Xerox” as a verb, stating that “You can't Xerox a Xerox on a Xerox.” Xerox continues to protect its trademark in most, if not all, trademark categories. Despite its efforts, many dictionaries continue to include the use of “Xerox” as a verb, including the Oxford English Dictionary. In 2012, the Intellectual Property Appellate Board (IPAB) of India declared “Xerox” a non-generic term after “almost 50 years (1963–2009) of continued existence on the register without challenge, and with proof of almost 44 years of use evident (1965–2009)”, but as of 2025, most Indians still use it as a synonym for photocopying.

The company has also advertised its trademark concerns, in an attempt to persuade journalists and others not to use “Xerox” as a verb.

In the 2025 science fiction film “M3GAN 2.0,” copyright and trademark issues were circumvented by naming the company “Xenox” (substituting an n for the r).

== See also ==
- Faxlore, often called 'Xeroxlore'
- List of Indian IT companies

== General references ==
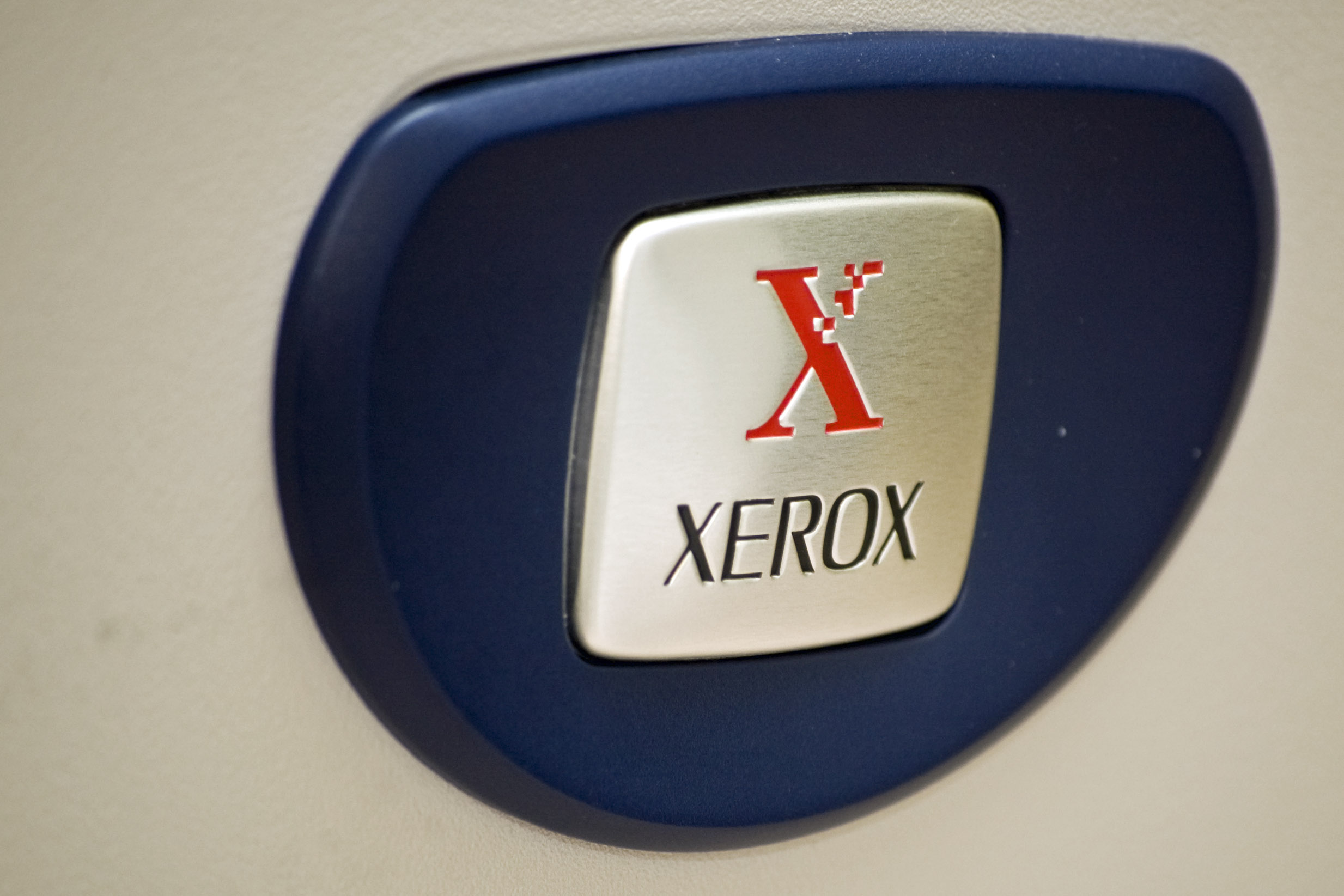

- Ellis, Charles D., Joe Wilson and the Creation of Xerox, Wiley, 2006, ISBN 978-0-471-99835-8.
- Owen, David, Copies in Seconds: How a Lone Inventor and an Unknown Company Created the Biggest Communication Breakthrough Since Gutenberg—Chester Carlson and the Birth of the Xerox Machine, Simon & Schuster, 2004, ISBN 978-0-7432-5117-4.
