= David T. Kearns =

American businessman (1930–2011)

David Kearns
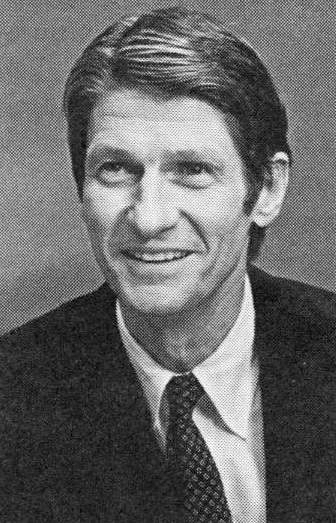
- Kearns, circa 1983

1st United States Deputy Secretary of Education
- In office May 31, 1991 – January 20, 1993
- President: George H. W. Bush
- Preceded by: Position established
- Succeeded by: Madeleine M. Kunin

Personal details
- Born: David Todd Kearns; August 11, 1930 Rochester, New York, U.S.
- Died: February 25, 2011 (aged 80) Vero Beach, Florida, U.S.
- Spouse: Shirley Virginia Cox
- Children: 6
- Education: University of Rochester (BBA)

Military service
- Branch/service: United States Navy

David Todd Kearns (August 11, 1930 – February 25, 2011) was an American businessman who was chairman and CEO of Xerox Corporation and served as the first United States Deputy Secretary of Education from 1991 to 1993.

== Early life and education ==
Kearns was born and raised in Rochester, New York where he met his future wife, Shirley Virginia Cox. He earned Bachelor of Business Administration from the University of Rochester in 1952, where he was a member of Delta Kappa Epsilon.

== Career ==
Kearns entered United States Navy flight school and was deployed to the Mediterranean Sea aboard the USS Coral Sea as an airman. Starting in 1954, Kearns worked at IBM.

=== Xerox Corporation ===
In 1971, Kearns joined Xerox Corporation as vice president. He also served as head of U.S./Marketing and Service at Xerox in Rochester, New York, and later as vice president of foreign markets in Stamford, Connecticut. In 1977, he became Xerox president and COO, and was then promoted to CEO in 1982. In 1985, Kearns succeeded Charles Peter McColough as chairman of Xerox.

=== U.S. Department of Education ===
Kearns was nominated by President George H. W. Bush as United States Deputy Secretary of Education on March 22, 1991. The United States Senate confirmed him for the position on May 31, 1991.

Following the Rodney King riots in Los Angeles, California, George H. W. Bush appointed Kearns as White House liaison to help resolve the conflict.

=== Later career ===
Kearns left the Department of Education on January 20, 1993. He later joined the faculty of Harvard University's Graduate School of Education where he taught for two years. Kearns has served on the board of trustees for the Ford Foundation, Time Warner, Dayton Hudson, and Ryder. He is also a former chairman of the National Urban League.

Kearns was Chairman of New American Schools, an organization dedicated to excellence in American schools. New American Schools has since merged with the American Institutes for Research.

The University of Rochester established the David T. Kearns Center for Leadership and Diversity in Science and Engineering to expand the pool of individuals who pursue undergraduate and graduate careers in the sciences and engineering.

Kearns published several books including: Winning the Brain Race: A Bold Plan to Make Our Schools Competitive (1988), Prophets in the Dark: How Xerox Reinvented Itself and Beat Back the Japanese (1992), A Legacy of Learning (1999) and Crossing the Bridge: Family, Business, Education, Cancer, and the Lessons Learned (2005).

His tenure is often examined in discussions of Xerox's difficulty in commercializing advanced technologies developed at Xerox PARC during the 1970s.

During Kearns’ leadership, Xerox made notable progress in stabilizing its core copier and document services business, particularly in response to increasing competition from Japanese manufacturers. He emphasized operational discipline, cost control, and quality improvement initiatives, including the adoption of benchmarking and total quality management practices. These efforts are widely credited with restoring Xerox's competitiveness in its primary markets.

However, critics argue that under Kearns’ leadership, Xerox continued to struggle with translating its pioneering research into successful commercial products outside its traditional business model. Although Xerox PARC had developed foundational technologies such as the graphical user interface, Ethernet networking, and advanced personal computing concepts, Xerox failed to bring these innovations to market at scale. Decision-making structures, incentive systems, and strategic priorities remained closely aligned with the company's established copier-centric revenue model.

Scholars and business analysts have suggested that Kearns viewed PARC primarily as a long-term research asset rather than a direct driver of near-term product innovation. As a result, commercialization efforts were often slow, fragmented, or deprioritized, allowing other firms—most notably Apple—to adapt and successfully market similar technologies. The organizational separation between PARC and Xerox's corporate leadership further limited the integration of research outputs into mainstream product development.

In retrospect, Kearns’ tenure is frequently characterized as a period in which Xerox successfully defended its existing business while failing to reposition itself for the emerging personal computing and software-driven technology landscape. While Kearns is credited with saving Xerox as a copier company, he is also associated with missed opportunities to transform Xerox into a broader information technology leader.

== Personal life ==
Kearns and his wife, Shirley, had four daughters and two sons. They also had 18 grandchildren.

Kearns lost his left eye to radiation treatment related to his cancer in 1993, prompting him to wear an eye patch for the rest of his life.

Kearns died on February 25, 2011, at the age of 80 in Vero Beach, Florida, from complications related to sinus cancer.

== Awards ==
- 1990, elected to the American Philosophical Society
- 1991, Golden Plate Award of the American Academy of Achievement presented by Awards Council member Sol Linowitz
- 1992, elected to the American Academy of Arts and Sciences
- 1996, University of Rochester's Hutchison Medal in 1996, the highest honor for an alumnus/a
- 2008, Frederick Douglass Medal, awarded jointly by the University of Rochester and the Frederick Douglass Institute for African and African-American Studies

Business positions
Preceded by Archie R. McCardell	President of Xerox Corporation; 1977–1985	Succeeded by Paul A. Allaire
Preceded by C. Peter McColough	CEO of Xerox Corporation; 1982 – July 31, 1990	Succeeded by Paul A. Allaire
Preceded by C. Peter McColough	Chairman of Xerox Corporation; 1985–1991	Succeeded by Paul A. Allaire
