= Paul Allaire =

American businessman (1938–2019)

Paul Arthur Allaire
- Died: February 24, 2019 (aged 80)
- Occupation: Entrepreneur
- Known for: Former Chairman of Xerox Corporation

Paul Arthur Allaire (July 21, 1938 – February 24, 2019) was an American entrepreneur who served as CEO and chairman of Xerox Corporation, and as a director on several other public companies.

Allaire graduated from Worcester Polytechnic Institute in 1960 with a Bachelor of Science degree in electrical engineering, where he was a brother of Phi Kappa Theta. He earned a Master of Science degree in industrial administration from Carnegie Mellon University in 1960. He was a trustee of both Worcester Polytechnic Institute and Carnegie Mellon University.

Allaire was born in Worcester, Massachusetts, and is the son of Arthur E. (a truck farmer) and Elodie (LaPrade) Murphy. On January 26, 1963, Allaire married Kathleen Buckley, with whom he had children, Brian and Christiana. He was a Democrat.

He was first hired by Xerox in 1966.

Year	Job Title	Branch
1966–70	Financial Analyst	Xerox Corp.
1970–73	Director of Financial Analysis	Rank Xerox Ltd.
1973–75	Director of Xerox Corp.	Xerox Corp.
1975–79	Chief staff Officer	Rank Xerox Ltd.
1979–83	Xerox Corp. managing director	Xerox Corp.
1983–86	Senior Vice-President	Xerox Corp.
1986–91	President	Xerox Corp.
1991 –	Chairman and CEO	Xerox Corp.

Allaire was named CEO in August 1990, succeeding David T. Kearns who retired at the mandatory age limit of 60. Allaire was elected as the company's chairman on May 29, 1991, after Kearns accepted an appointment as Secretary of Education in the administration of President George H. W. Bush. Allaire transformed the office of the president into a newly formed corporate office, with four executives dividing the responsibilities that usually fall under the president and chief operating officer. The group shared operational responsibilities for Xerox's nine worldwide business units and three worldwide geographic customer operations units. One of these four key officials was A. Barry Rand, executive vice president of operations, and one of the highest-ranking African-Americans in business at the time.

When Allaire became CEO, Xerox had billions of dollars in insurance liabilities, so he methodically disentangled the company from property and casualty insurance and other financial-services businesses. Allaire also rolled out cost-cutting and new product technology introductions, including the first digital copier-Document Center. In 1994, Allaire rebranded Xerox as "The Document Company" to signal its ambition to move far beyond copiers, as the growth of desktop computing stimulated huge increases in the number of documents being created. Under Allaire's "Leadership through Quality" program, Xerox was the first U.S. company to win back lost market share from the Japanese.

Allaire earned a reputation throughout his Xerox career as a cost cutter who reorganized departments and increased market share. In his short tenure as chairman, he tried innovative marketing techniques, such as replacing dissatisfied customers' equipment free of charge, and selling home-office products in supermarkets. He boldly lopped off Xerox's entire interest in financial services, directing the company back to its major strengths – the production of what Xerox called "document systems."

In 1997, Allaire hired G. Richard Thoman from IBM as Xerox President and COO which positioned Thoman as the eventual successor, and this news caused the company shares to rise $2 (2.9%) to $71.75 on the New York Stock Exchange, after earlier touching a record $73.25. A protégé of Lou Gerstner, Thoman was serving as Senior Vice President and CFO of IBM, and before that as Senior Vice President and general manager of IBM's Personal Systems Group which he led a successful turnaround. In April 1999 at the company annual meeting, Allaire was succeeded as CEO by Thoman but remained chairman of the board; Allaire had intended to retire but the board convinced him to stay on since Thoman was an outsider. As a nod to CFO Barry D. Romeril and William F. Buehler, who were Allaire loyalists that were ending up passed over in the succession planning, Allaire requested that they be given seats on the board as vice-chairman.

Allaire and Thoman both shared the vision that Xerox needed to reinvent itself to succeed in the Digital Age, and Thoman's record of working with Gerstner in IBM's turnaround made him the ideal person to lead the transformation. However, it has been reported that many of Xerox's senior executives including Romeril and Buehler remained loyal to Allaire and viewed Thoman as an outsider. These undercut Thoman's authority as CEO, as he was only able to make a few senior management changes, and the entrenched bureaucracy as Xerox (nicknamed "Burox") provided passive resistance to Thoman's initiatives. This in turn may have contributed to several botched reorganizations under his tenure.

After Thoman was fired in 2000, Allaire was once again appointed CEO, and he promoted Anne M. Mulcahy to President and COO. Allaire retired as CEO on August 1, 2001, being succeeded by Mulcahy. Allaire remained chairman of the board until the end of 2001. In 2000, he was also a recipient of the Silver Olympic Order.

After leaving Xerox, Allaire became the chairman of GlaxoSmithKline's remuneration committee where he remained until his retirement in 2003, which was forced as part of a settlement with the SEC. He is also a former member of the Steering Committee of the Bilderberg Group.

Allaire, Thoman, Romeril, and three other senior Xerox executives paid the SEC $22 million to settle accusations by securities regulators that they participated in a large accounting fraud that allowed the company to overstate its profits by $1.4 billion from 1997 to 2000. As the "Xerox six" were not found guilty of wrongdoing, Xerox said that it would reimburse the executives for all but $3 million of the $22 million and cover their legal fees. The $3 million was classified as a fine by the SEC and cannot be reimbursed under its rules.

Business positions
Preceded by David T. Kearns	President of Xerox Corporation; August 12, 1986–1991	Vacant Title next held by G. Richard Thoman
Preceded by David T. Kearns	CEO of Xerox Corporation; August 1, 1990 – April 6, 1999	Succeeded by G. Richard Thoman
Preceded by G. Richard Thoman	CEO of Xerox Corporation; May 11, 2000 – July 31, 2001	Succeeded by Anne M. Mulcahy
Preceded by David T. Kearns	Chairman of Xerox Corporation; 1991 – December 31, 2001	Succeeded by Anne M. Mulcahy
