= Tungsram =

Hungarian lighting company

- Industry: Lighting
- Founded: 1896
- Fate: Dissolved
- Headquarters: Budapest, Hungary
- Key people: Jörg Bauer
- Revenue: Approximately 300 million (Fiscal Year 2017)
- Number of employees: Approximately 4,000 (end of February 2018)

Tungsram was a manufacturing company located in Hungary and known for their light bulbs and electronics. Established in Újpest (today part of Budapest, Hungary) in 1896, it initially produced telephones, wires and switchboards. The name "Tungsram" is a portmanteau of tungsten (/ˈtʌŋstən/ TUNG-stən) and wolfram (/ˈwʊlfrəm/ WUUL-frəm), the two common names of the metal used for making light bulb filaments. Before becoming nationalized by the Communist government in 1945, the company was the world's third largest manufacturer of light bulbs and radiotubes, after the American General Electric and RCA companies.

== History ==
On 13 December 1904, Hungarian Sándor Just and Croatian Franjo Hanaman were granted Hungarian patent no. 34541 for the world's first tungsten filament bulb that lasted longer and produced brighter light than a carbon filament. The co-inventors licensed their patent to the company, which came to be named Tungsram after the eponymous tungsten incandescent bulbs, which are still called Tungsram bulbs in many European countries. In 1934, Tungsram incorporated a patent by Imre Bródy for bulbs filled with krypton gas, providing for a longer bulb lifetime. During World War I mass production of radio tubes began and became the most profitable division of the company.

In March 1937, the first television experimental broadcasts of still images (Tungsram trademark and Mickey Mouse) began in the Tungsram laboratory, initially with low FPS. With the help of the charge storage video camera developed by the company, a successful continuous motion picture transmission was tested in an experimental TV broadcasting station at Újpest in June 1937.

British Tungsram Radio Works was a subsidiary of Hungarian Tungsram in pre-war days.

In 1990, General Electric acquired a majority stake in Tungsram and over six years invested $600 million in the venture, restructuring every aspect of its operations. At the time, this was the largest manufacturing investment by a U.S. firm in Central and Eastern Europe. Thereafter Tungsram operated as a subsidiary of General Electric and the name merely was retained as a brand.

In February 2018, the CEO of GE Hungary, Jörg Bauer agreed to buy GEʼs lighting business in Europe, the Middle East, Africa and Turkey, as well as its global automotive lighting business. The business continued to operate again under the name Tungsram Group.

From February 2020, business partners of the company were able to use a newly opened Tungsram Lounge at Budapest's Ferenc Liszt International Airport.

In April 2022, Tungsram laid off 1600 employees and then in May they filed for bankruptcy protection. In November nearing the end of the six month protection period they announced they had been unable to come to an agreement with their creditors and were thus going into liquidation. As part of the liquidation process it was decided the Zalaegerszeg plant would continue to operate under the name Scintilla Fémalkatrész Kft.

=== Factories in Hungary ===
- Budapest, Váci út - Light source factory
- Győr - Target machine design, production
- Nagykanizsa - Light Source Factory and Logistics Centre
- Kisvárda - Halogen and Automotive Lamp Factory
- Zalaegerszeg - Component factory
- Hajdúböszörmény - Component factory
- Budapest, Fóti út - Machinery Division, Vacuum Engineering Machine Factory (closed)
- Vác - Light source factory (closed)
- Kaposvár - Electron tube factory (closed)
- Hajdúnánás - Component factory (closed)

== Famous engineers and inventors ==
- Zoltán Bay (1900–1992)
- Imre Bródy (1891–1944)
- Ernő Winter (1897–1971)
- György Szigeti (1905–1978)
- Tivadar Millner (1899–1988)
- Egon Orowan (1902–1989)
- Michael Polanyi (1891–1976
- Dennis Gabor (1900–1979)
- Pál Selényi (1884–1954)
- Franjo Hanaman (1878–1941)
- Sándor Just (1874–1937)
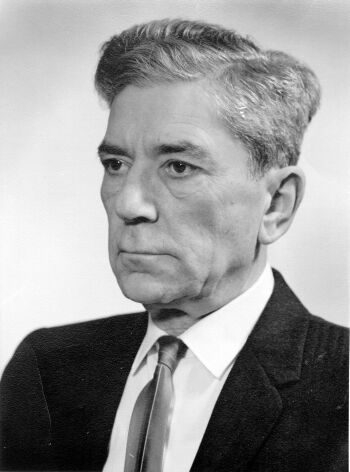
Zoltán Bay

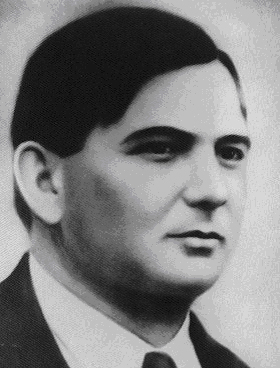
Imre Bródy

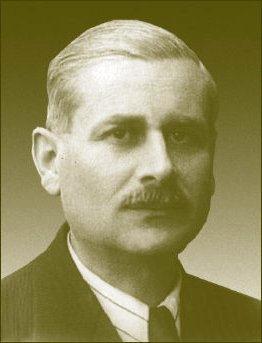
Tivadar Millner

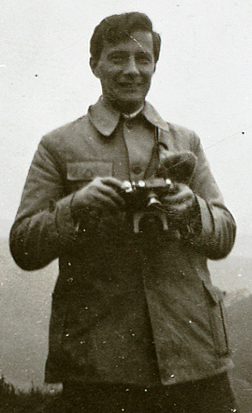
Michael Polanyi

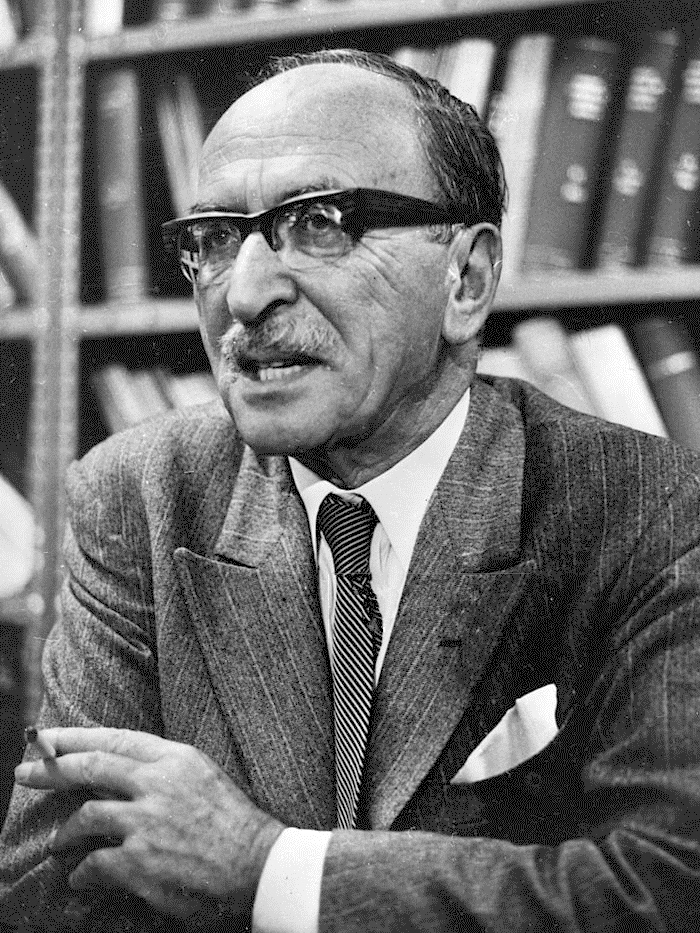
Dennis Gabor

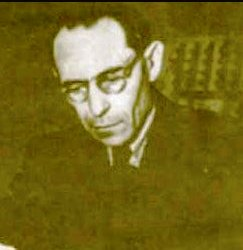
Pál Selényi

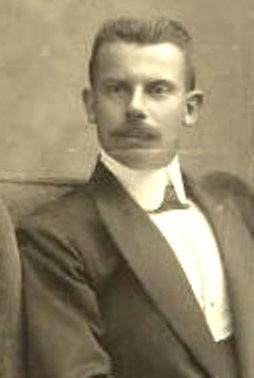
Franjo Hanaman

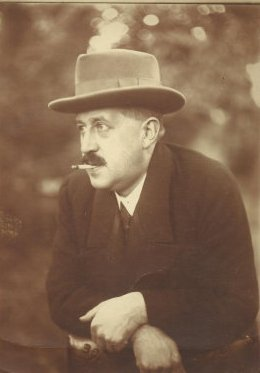
Sándor Just

== Gallery ==
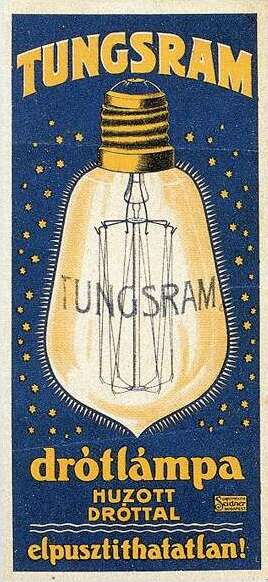
Hungarian advertising of the Tungsram-bulb from 1906. This was the first light bulb that used a filament made from tungsten instead of carbon. The inscription reads: wire lamp with a drawn wire – indestructible

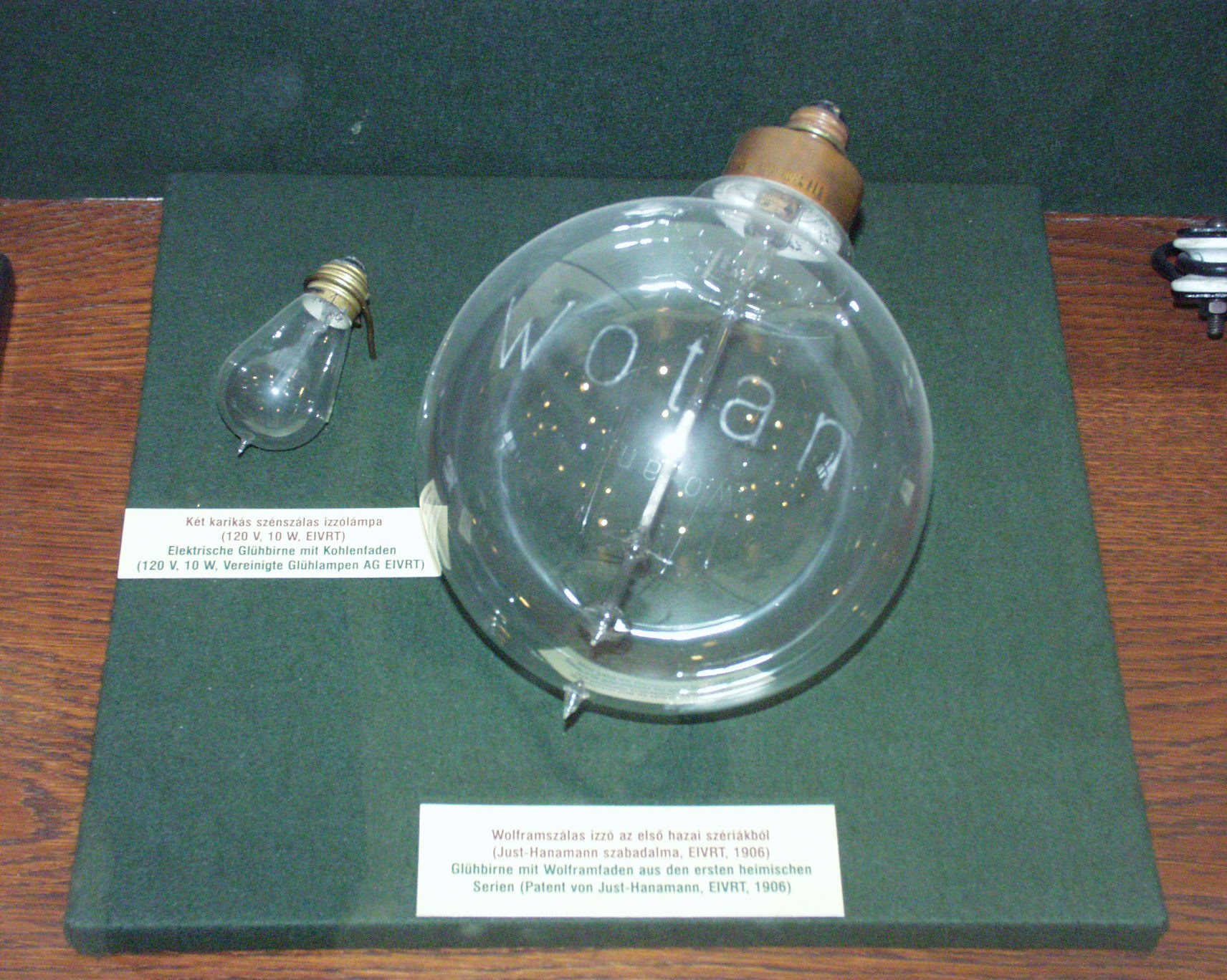
Incandescent light bulbs with carbon filaments (left) and the modern tungsten bulb (right) (not a Tungsram)

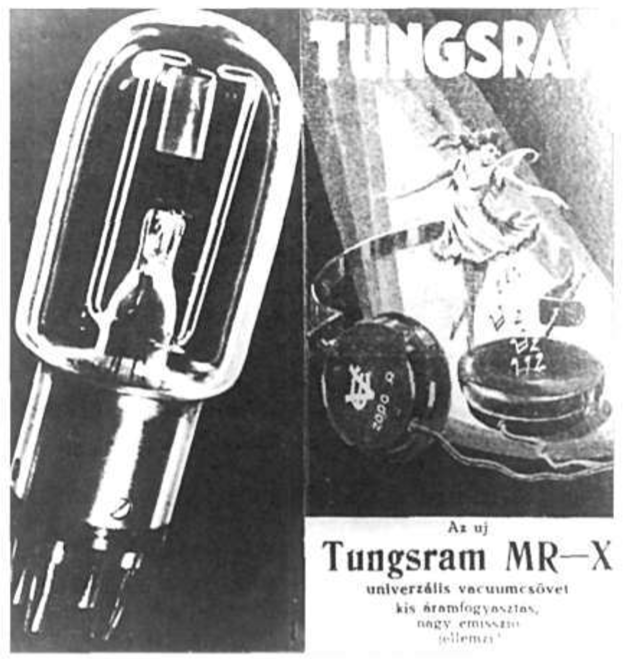
Tungsram MR-X radio transmitter tube for audio communication (1917)

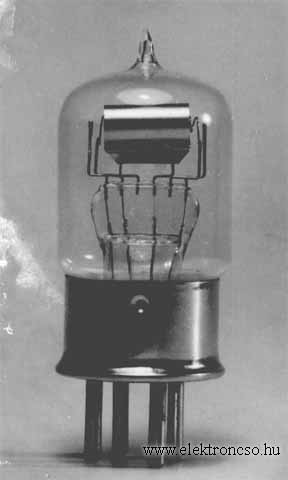
Tungsram H2 radio transmitter tube prototype 1916

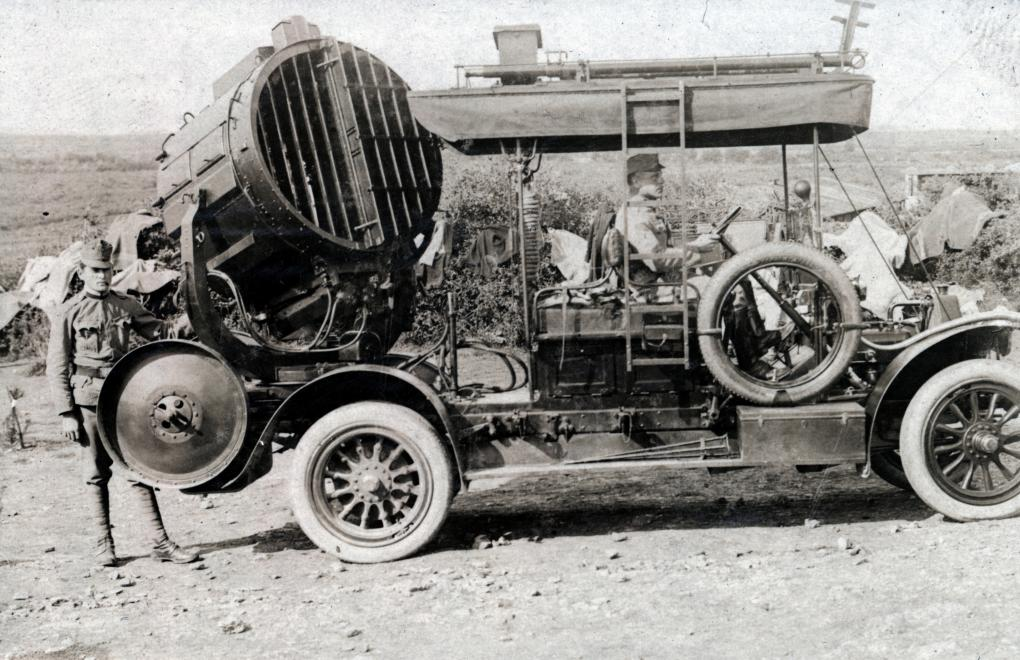
Tungsram searchlight for air defense (1914)

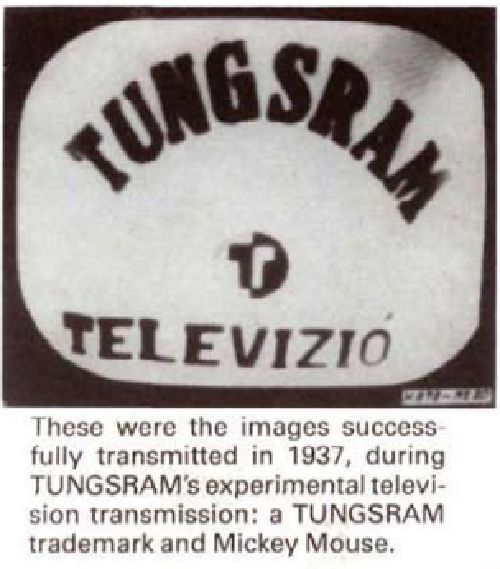
Tungsram television prototype in 1937

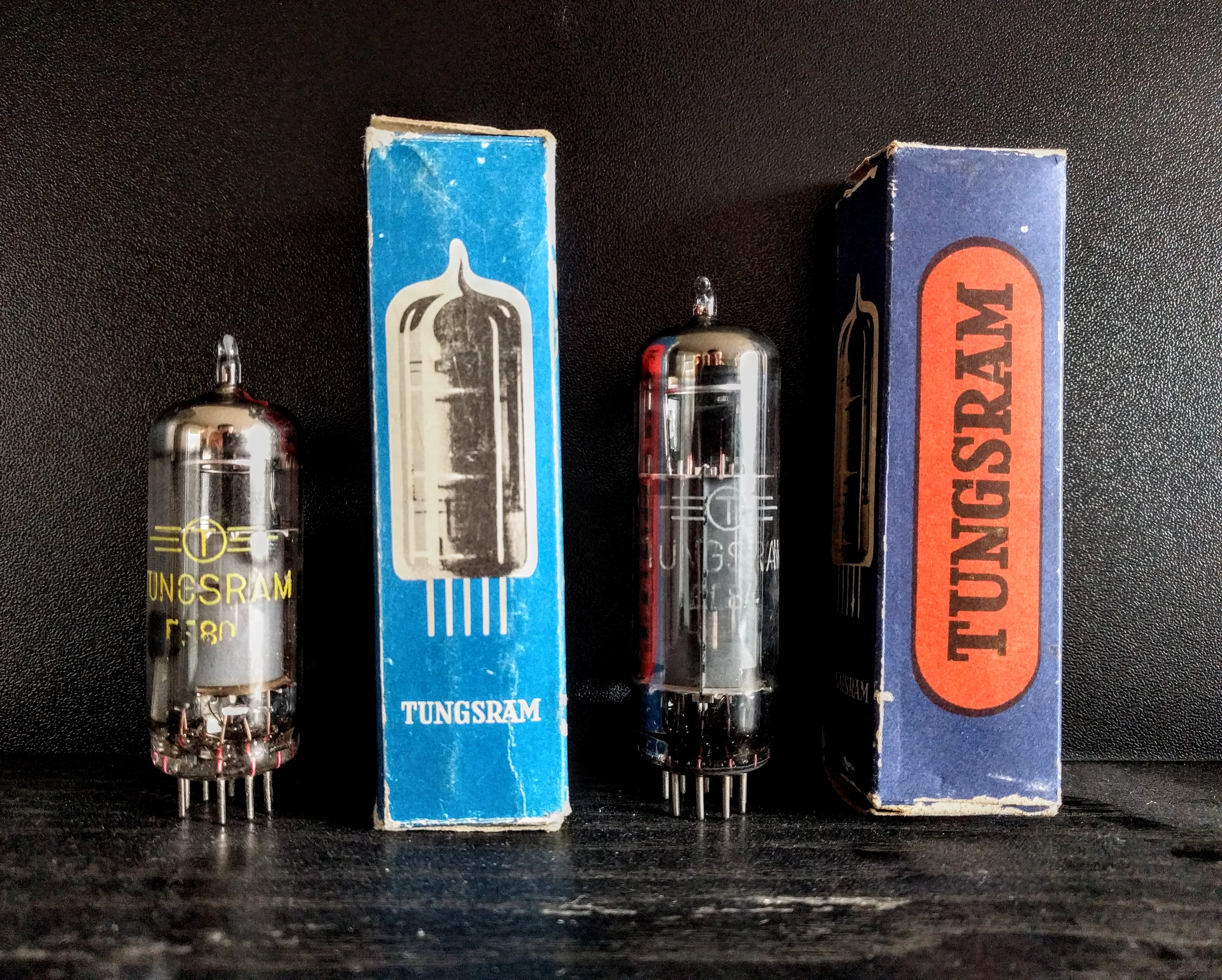
Tungsram commercial vacuum tubes from the 1970s

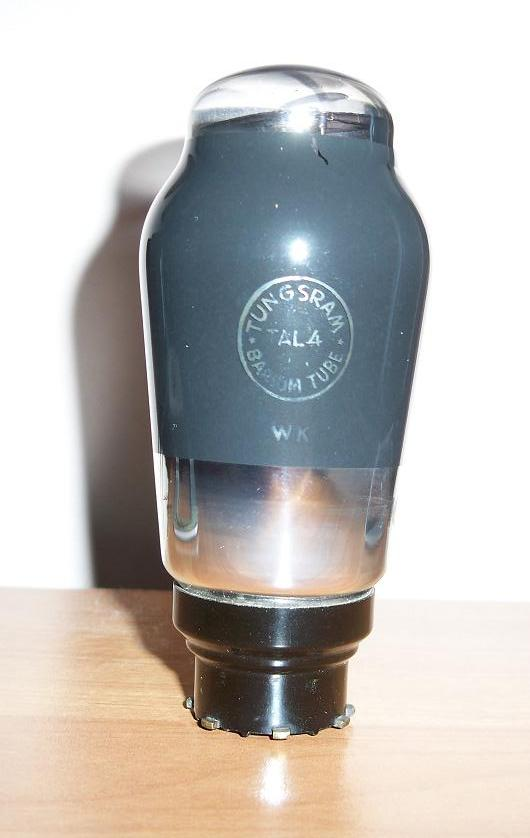
Tungsram vacuum tubes

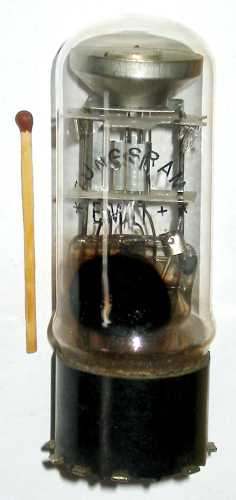
Tungsram vacuum tubes

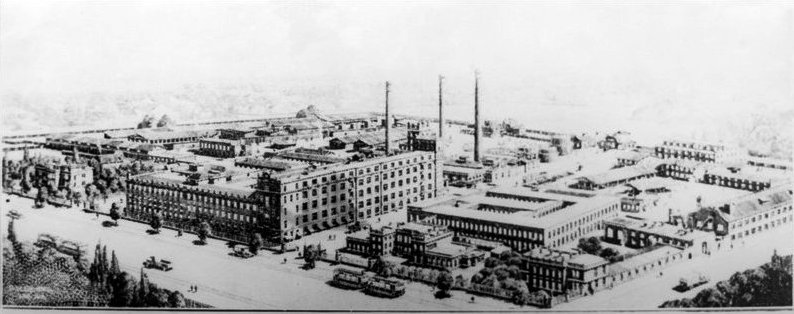
The factory in Budapest in 1920

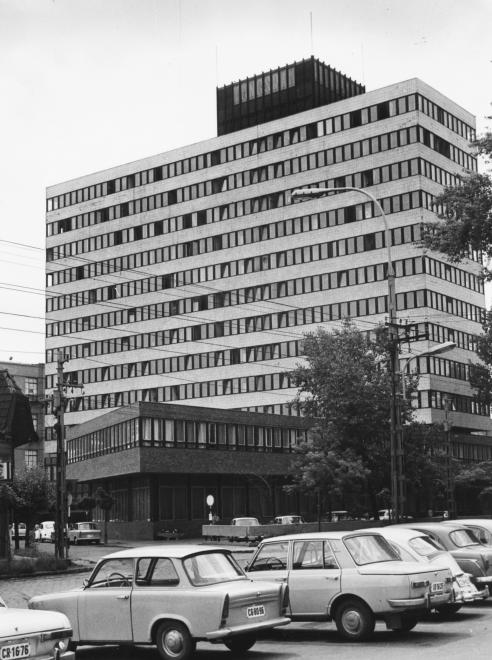
Former Headquarter of the United Lightbulb and Electronic Ltd

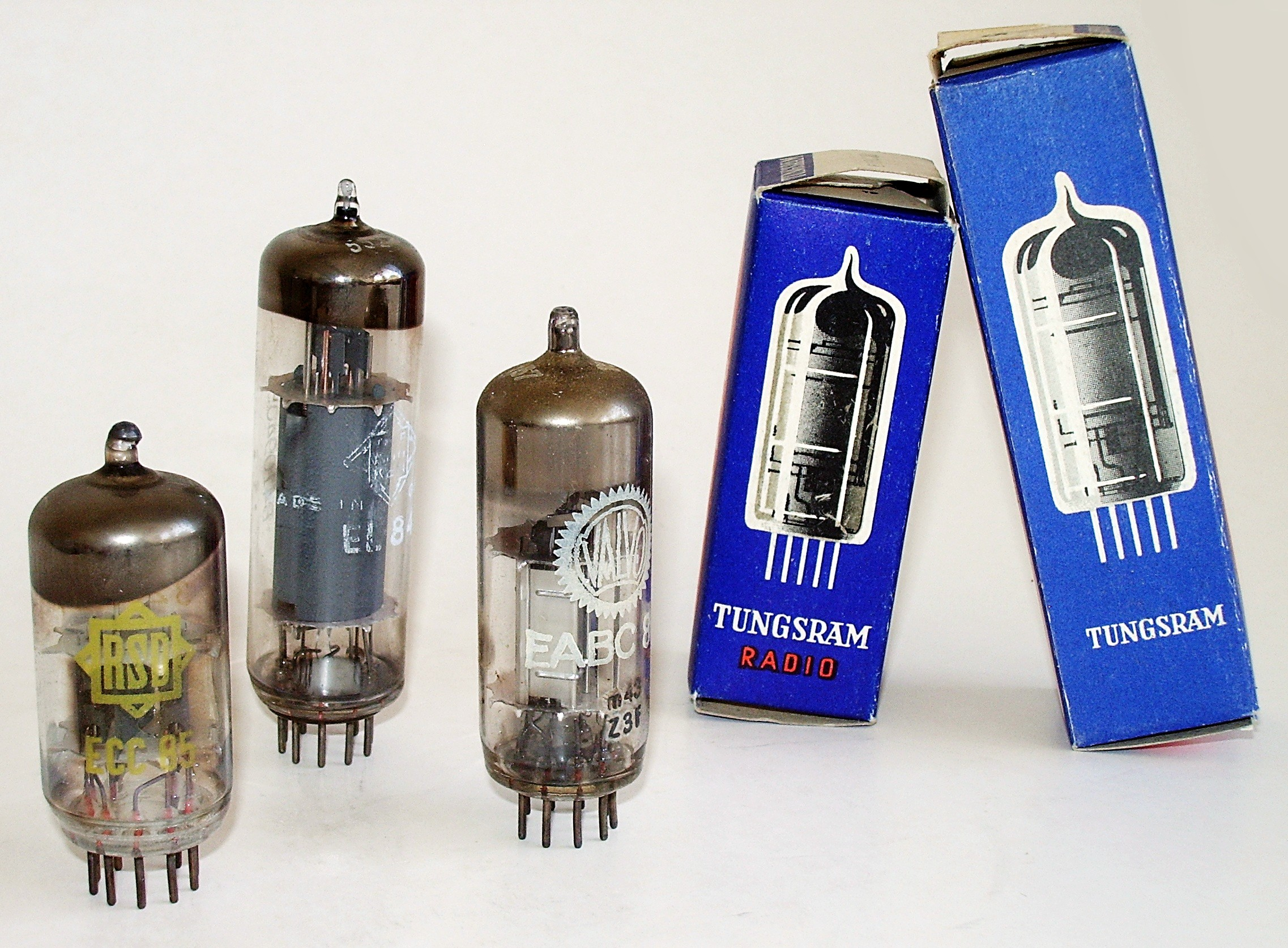
Tungsram vacuum tubes

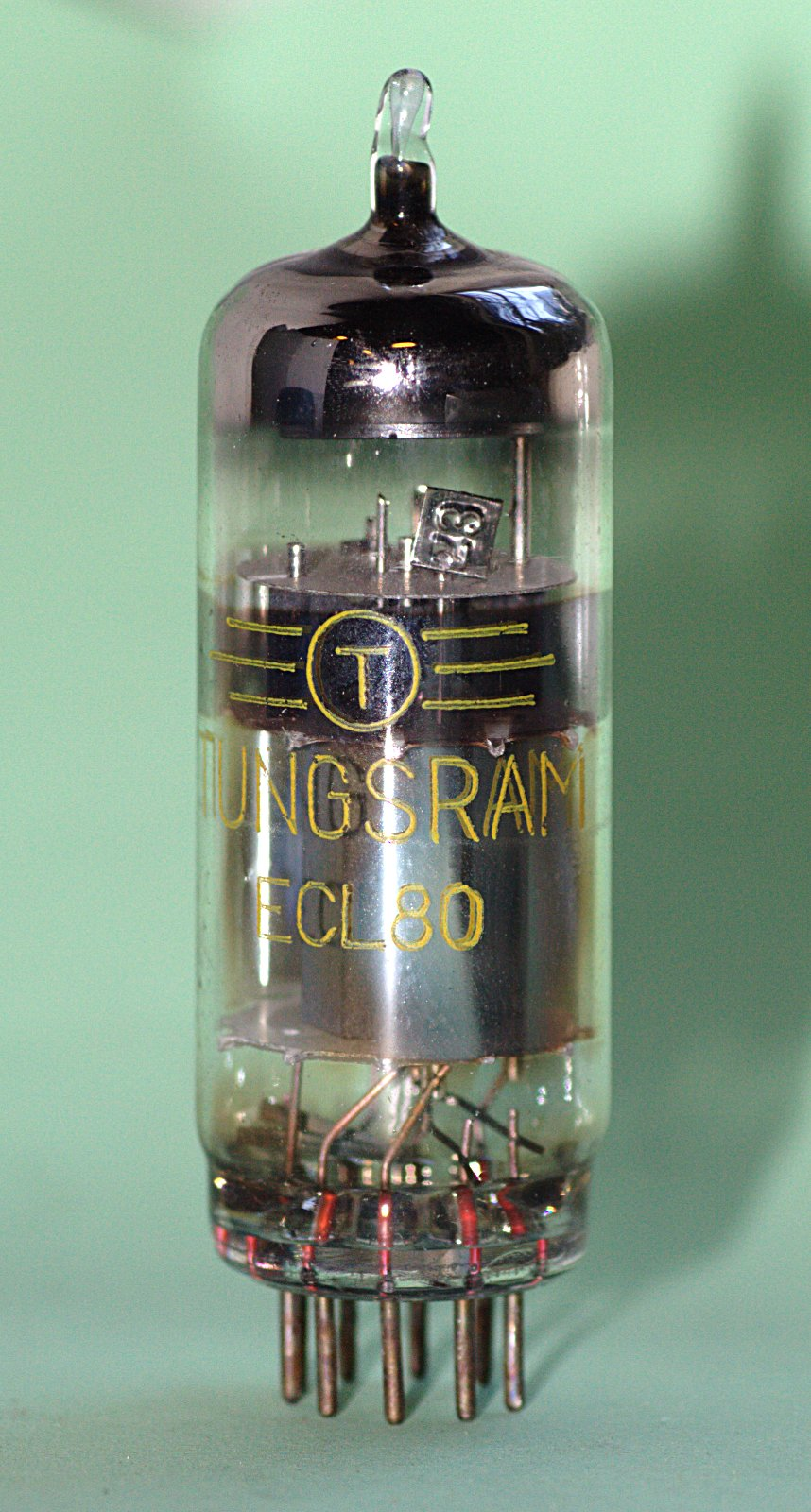
Tungsram vacuum tubes

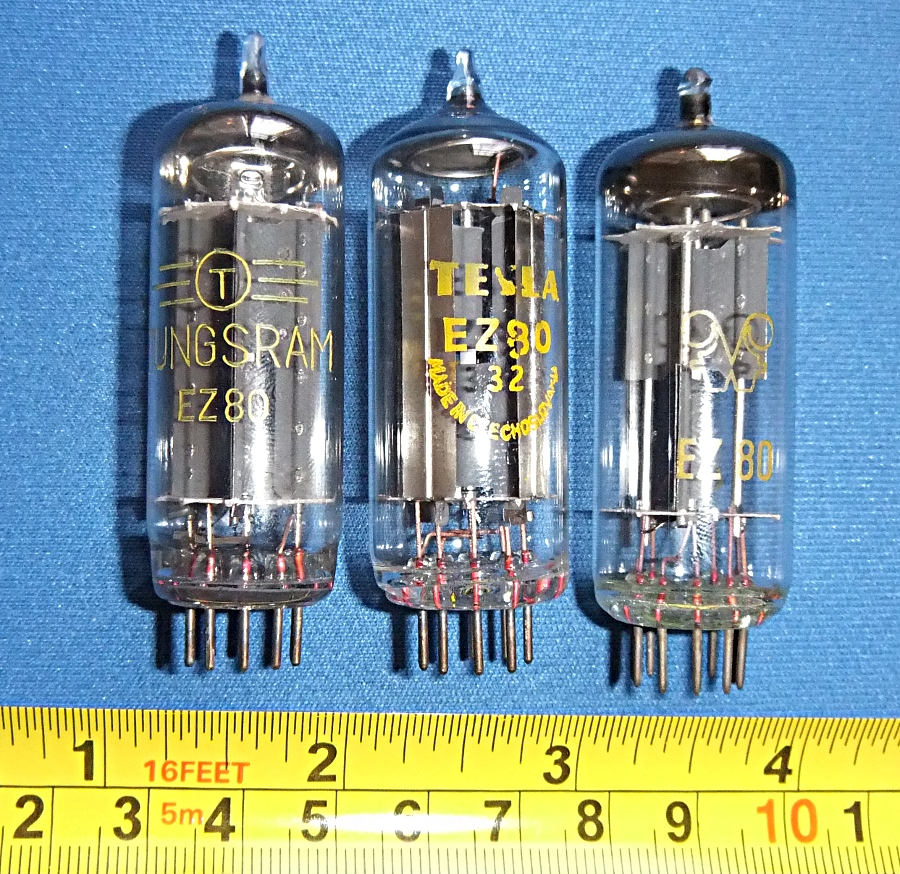
Tungsram vacuum tubes

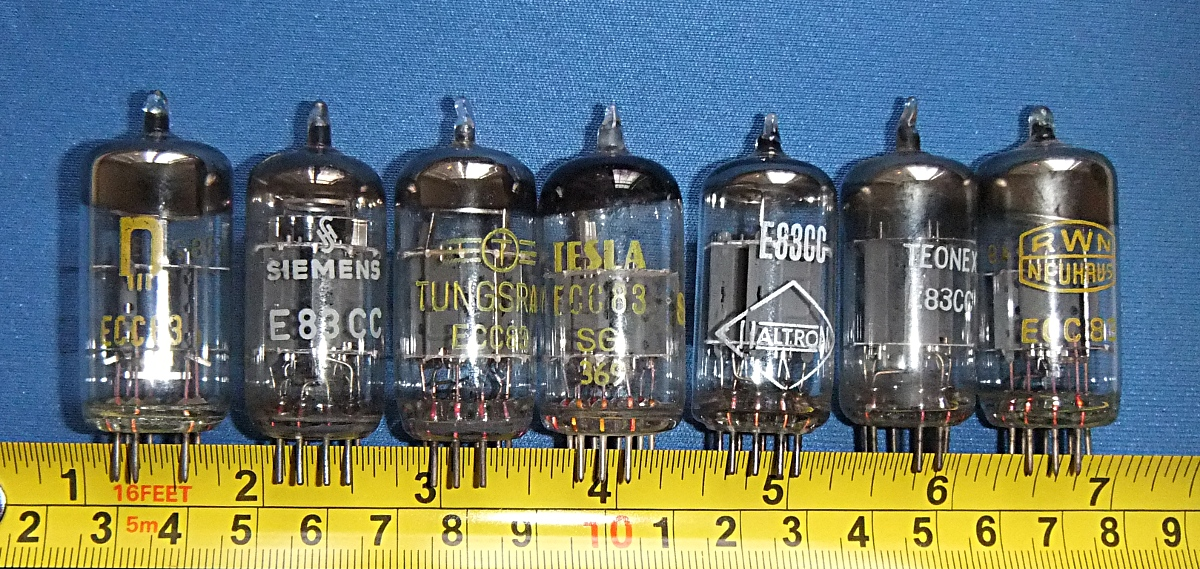
Tungsram vacuum tubes

== See also ==
- Tungsram SC (sports club)
