= Edison light bulb =

Type of lightbulb

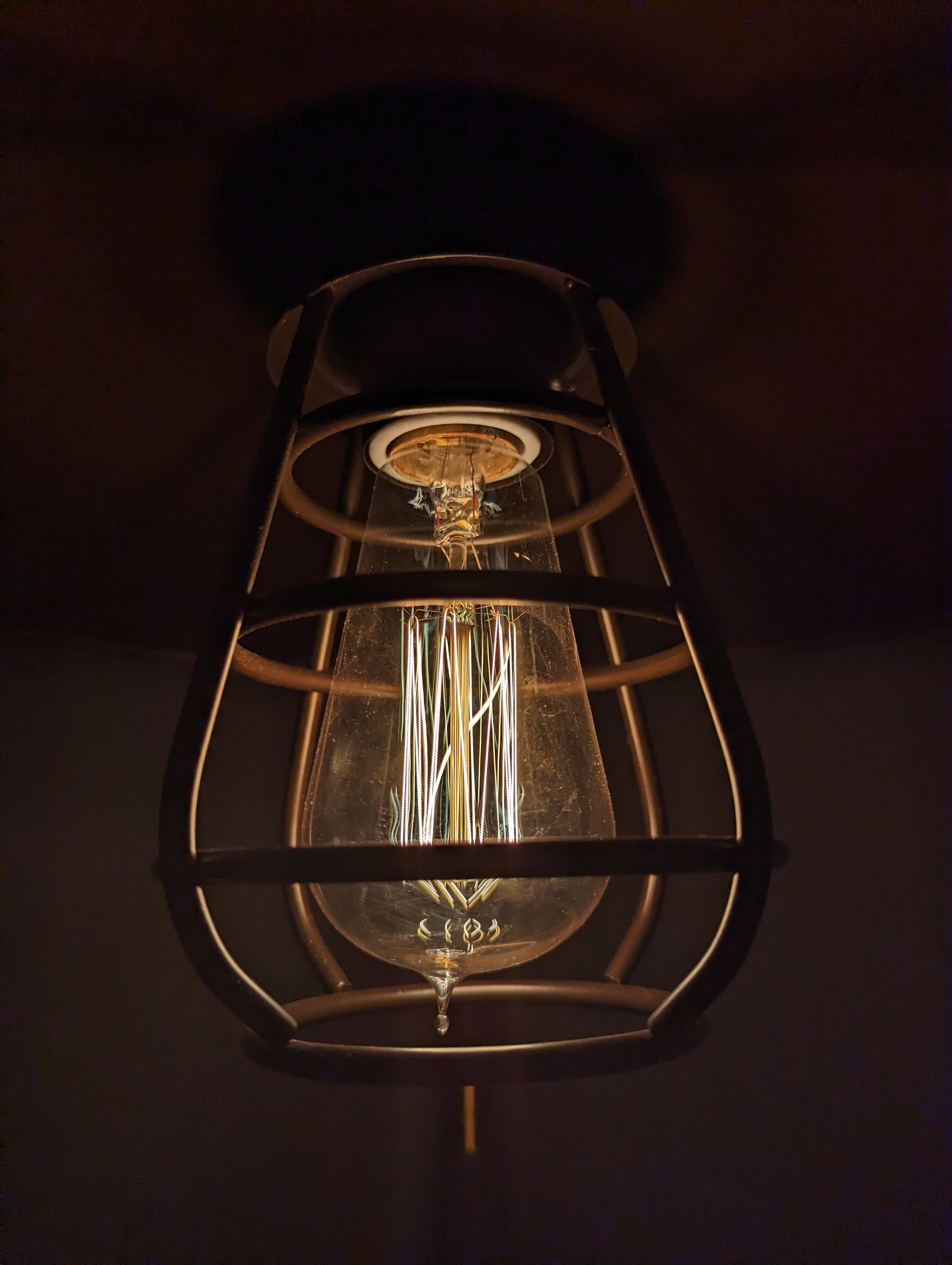
Edison light bulb enclosed in a cage

Edison light bulbs, also known as filament light bulbs and retroactively referred to as antique light bulbs or vintage light bulbs, are either carbon- or early tungsten-filament incandescent light bulbs, or modern bulbs that reproduce their appearance. Most of the bulbs in circulation are reproductions of the wound filament bulbs made popular by Edison Electric Light Company at the turn of the 20th century. They are easily identified by the long and complicated windings of their internal filaments, and by the very warm-yellow glow of the light they produce (many of the bulbs emit light at a color temperature of 2200–2400 K).

Visible light spectrum of a 120V 40W filament Edison bulb

== History ==
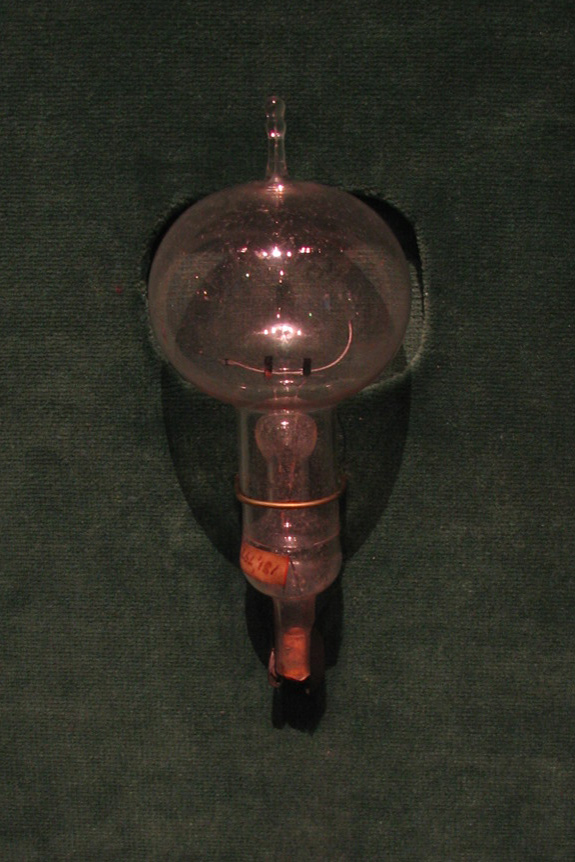
Original carbon-filament bulb from Thomas Edison's shop in Menlo Park

Light bulbs with a carbon filament were first demonstrated by Thomas Edison in October 1879. October 21 was celebrated annually for many decades in the United States as Edison Day to commemorate this achievement.

These carbon filament bulbs, the first electric light bulbs, became available commercially that same year. In 1904 a tungsten filament was invented by Austro-Hungarians Alexander Just and Franjo Hanaman, and was more efficient and longer-lasting than the carbonized bamboo filament used previously. The introduction of a neutral gas to the glass envelope (or bulb) also helped to improve the lifespan and brightness of the bulb. To produce enough light, these lamps required the use of extremely long filaments, which remained so until the development of more efficiently wound tungsten filaments.

In the 1960s, US inventor Robert (Bob) Kyp patented a similar in appearance but flickering "electric flame" light bulb under the name Balafire as well as radiometers. His flicker bulb was used in a 7-Up commercial, and the company he ran since 1964, Kyp-Go, is currently the only US manufacturer of carbon-filament bulbs.

== Resurgence ==
In the 1980s, after watching a salvage operation, Bob Rosenzweig started the reproduction and selling of his faux-antique bulbs. These vintage-style light bulb reproductions were sold mostly to collectors and prop houses, and continued until the turn of the 21st century when new regulations banned low-efficiency lighting in many countries. However, while domestic lighting shifted toward more efficient compact fluorescent lamps and LED lights, demand for vintage bulbs likewise increased. Sold as "specialty lighting", Edison-style incandescent lamps are exempted from the ban in most places.

More contemporary "Edison light bulbs" are designed to replicate the same light color and bulb shape of the original, but offer a more energy-efficient version to Rosenzweig's popular vintage reproduction bulbs (modern tungsten coils are already more efficient). These bulbs maintain the same "exposed" look to further preserve the vintage reproduction style, and often employ the "ST" long-pear bulb shape for the same reason. LED bulbs, including LED retro types, are much more energy-efficient than any incandescent lighting.

A 2010 article in The New York Times noted that some restaurants were hanging hundreds of Edison light bulbs from their ceilings, stating: "Whether in hip hangouts tapping into the popular Victorian industrial look or elegant rooms seeking to warm up their atmosphere, the bulb has become a staple for restaurant designers, in part because it emulates candlelight and flatters both dinner and diner."

Within several years, the aesthetic spread globally. By August 2016, design reporter Kyle Chayka bemoaned in The Verge that every new cafe around the world was beginning to look the same no matter whether a person was "in Odessa, Beijing, Los Angeles, or Seoul: the same raw wood tables, exposed brick, and hanging Edison bulbs". Quartz would later trace the popularization of these looks to Brooklyn, New York.

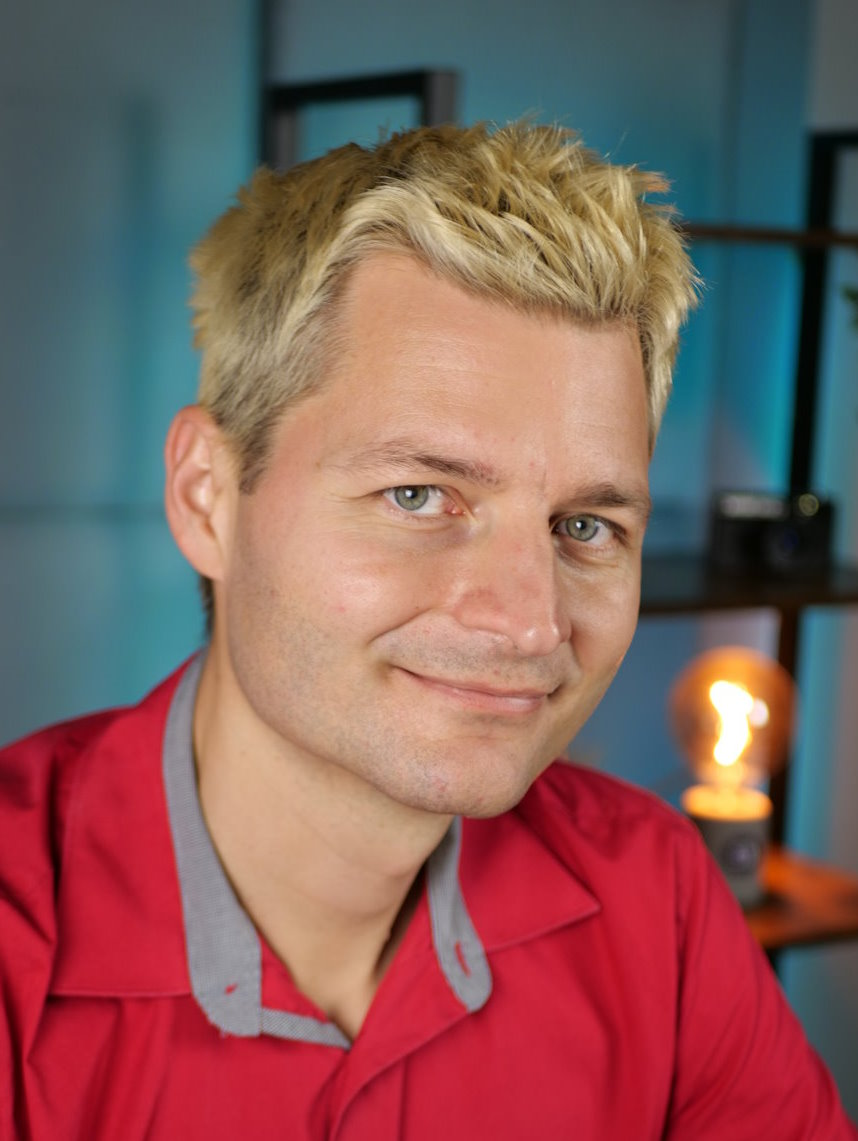
Example of a portrait using a contemporary Edison-style light bulb in the background.

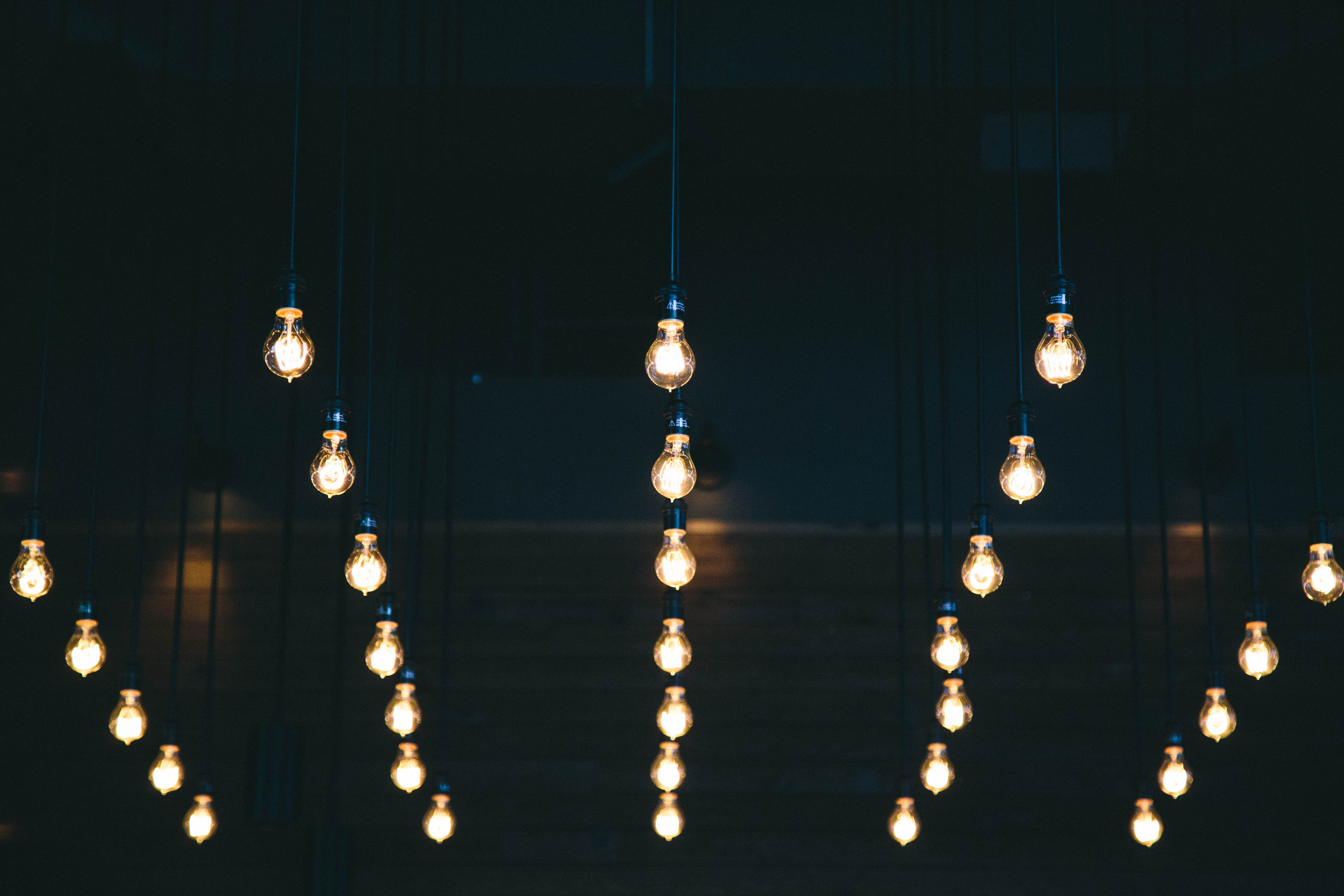
Example of contemporary Edison-style light bulbs installed in the ceiling of the room.

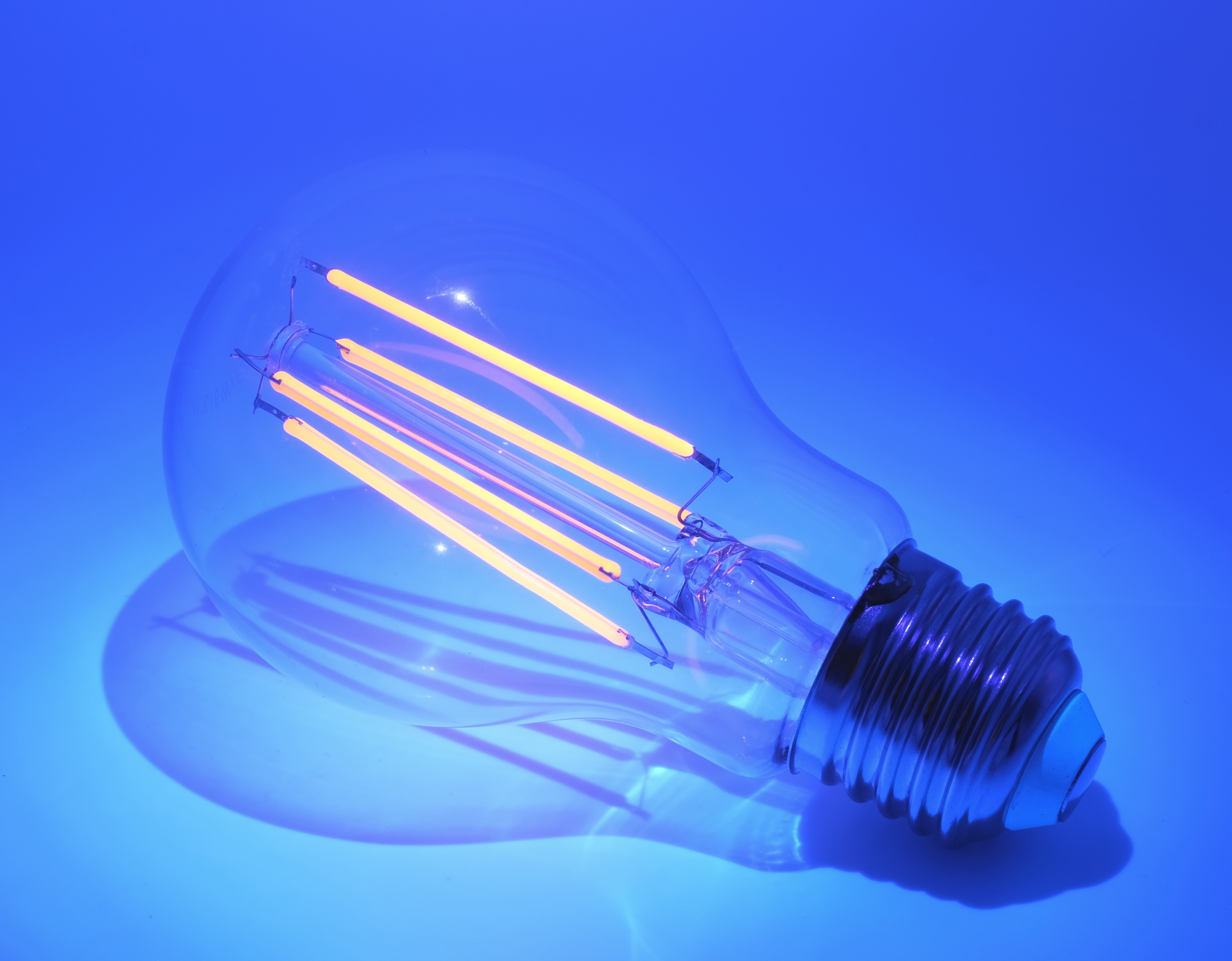
Example of a contemporary Edison-style LED bulb.
