= Joseph C. Wilson (entrepreneur) =

American businessman (1909–1971)

Joseph Chamberlain Wilson (December 13, 1909 – November 22, 1971) was the founder of the Xerox Corporation, a graduate of the University of Rochester and Harvard Business School and a member of the Delta Kappa Epsilon fraternity (Beta Phi chapter). He helped to develop xerography pioneered by Chester Carlson.

As president of Xerox, he made an effort to integrate Xerox during the late 1960s. After the race riots that began in Detroit had reached Xerox headquarters in Rochester, New York, Wilson wrote in a letter to all Xerox managers that "he wanted a very aggressive program to recruit and hire blacks in this company."

The former West High School in Rochester, New York was renamed Joseph C. Wilson Magnet High School in his honor. One of its magnet programs is for science and technology, and has a long-running partnership with Xerox, which funds and supplies mentors for an extracurricular computer science club. Wilson Magnet has long had a very strong program of Advanced Placement (AP) courses, and later also began offering International Baccalaureate (IB) courses. It is often honored for excellence; in the late 1980s it was ranked the ninth best high school in New York State, The Washington Post in 2004 said it is "regarded as one of the nation's most intellectually demanding" schools.

The Wilson Commons as well as Wilson Boulevard at the University of Rochester river campus are also named after Joe Wilson.

The Wilson family continues Joseph Wilson's tradition of philanthropy in the Rochester area mainly through the Marie C. and Joseph C. Wilson Foundation.

Wilson was inducted into the Junior Achievement U.S. Business Hall of Fame in 1980.

The Joseph C. Wilson papers were made available in May 2019 through the University of Rochester Rare Books, Special Collections, and Preservation library; they were given to the University by Marie C. Wilson. This collection consists of correspondence, minutes, reports, speeches, and clippings from Wilson's participation in numerous business and community organizations. The bulk of the collection is dated 1959-1971, a period of growth for Xerox as well as the city and University of Rochester.

Business positions
Preceded by Joseph R. Wilson	President of Xerox Corporation; 1946 – 1966	Succeeded by C. Peter McColough
New creation	CEO of Xerox Corporation; 1961 – 1967	Succeeded by C. Peter McColough
Preceded by Sol M. Linowitz	Chairman of Xerox Corporation; 1966 – December 12, 1971	Succeeded by C. Peter McColough
