= Pál Selényi =

Hungarian engineer

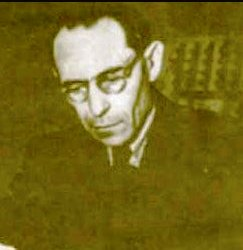
Pál Selényi

Engineer Pál Selényi (17 November 1884 – 21 March 1954) was known as the "father of xerography" at Tungsram corporation.

He is also known as Paul Selenyi. Chester Carlson read one of Selenyi's papers in the 1930s and was very greatly impressed; subsequently, he invested in a big effort to develop xerography. That may be the reason why Selenyi was known as the "father of xerography" by some people. Pál Selényi studied physics and mathematics at the Budapest University. After finishing his studies, Selényi started to work for the newly created Applied Physics Department of the University.

From his early works, Selényi was engaged in studying the nature of light. One well-known result of this period is Selényi's wide-angle interference experiment whose foundations go back to the discovery of the photoeffect (photo-electric effect), by Albert Einstein, and Hertz's experiments on the reflection of radio waves.

Einstein's hypothesis was: elementary light sources emit electromagnetic waves along small solid angles, which had been supported by the fact that interference is simplest to achieve with lightwaves intersecting one another under small angles. The Young experiment is an example: light passing through a pair of neighboring holes (in close proximity) results in the appearance of interference patterns on a screen behind the holes, but only if the angle covered by the incoming beams does not exceed a couple of degrees of angular width.
