= Xerox 914 =

1959 model of photocopier produced by Xerox; first successful commercial photocopier

Xerox 914 photo copier

The Xerox 914 was the first successful commercial plain paper copier. Introduced in 1959 by the Haloid/Xerox company, it revolutionized the document-copying industry. The culmination of inventor Chester Carlson's work on the xerographic process, the 914 was fast and economical. The copier was introduced to the public on September 16, 1959, in a demonstration at the Sherry-Netherland Hotel in New York, shown on live television.

== Background ==
Xerography, a process of producing images using electricity, was invented in 1938 by physicist-lawyer Chester Floyd "Chet" Carlson (1906–1968), and an engineering partner, Otto Kornei. Carlson entered into a research agreement with the Battelle Memorial Institute in 1945, when he and Kornei produced the first operable copy machine. He sold his rights in 1947 to the Haloid Company, a wet-chemical photopaper manufacturer, founded in 1906 in Rochester, New York.

Haloid introduced the first commercial xerographic copier, the Xerox Model A, in 1949. The company had, the previous year, announced the refined development of xerography in collaboration with Battelle Development Corporation, of Columbus, Ohio. Manually operated, it was also known as the Ox Box. An improved version, Camera #1, was introduced in 1950. Haloid was renamed Haloid Xerox in 1958, and, after the instant success of the 914, when the name Xerox soon became synonymous with "copy", would become the Xerox Corporation.

In 1963, Xerox introduced the first desktop copier to make copies on plain paper, the 813. It was designed by Jim Balmer and William H. Armstrong of Armstrong-Balmer & Associates, and won a 1964 Certificate of Design Merit from the Industrial Designers Institute (IDI). Balmer had recently left Harley Earl, Inc., where he had been a designer since 1946, to co-establish Armstrong-Balmer & Associates in 1958. At Earl, Balmer had been involved in the Secretary copy machine designed for Thermofax and introduced by 3M in 1958, and Haloid Xerox had been impressed with the design, engaging Balmer to consult on the final design of the 914.

A year later, in 1964, Balmer worked with Xerox to establish their first internal industrial design group. Among those first design employees were William Dalton and Robert Van Valkinburgh.

== Specifications and features ==
The 914 model (so-called because it could copy originals up to 9 inches by 14 inches (229 mm × 356 mm)) could make 100,000 copies per month (seven copies per minute). In 1985, the Smithsonian received a Xerox 914, number 517 off the assembly line. It weighs approximately 650 pounds (294 kg) and measures 42" (107 cm) high × 46" (117 cm) wide × 45" (114 cm) deep.

The machine was mechanically complex. It required a large technical support force, and had a tendency to catch fire when overheated. According to technology historian Edward Tenner, during the development of the technology, copiers were found to catch fire on documents that had too many zeros or "O"s. Because of the problem, the Xerox company provided a "scorch eliminator", which was actually a small fire extinguisher, along with the copier. Ralph Nader was among those to complain about the copier fires, reporting that the machine at his office in Washington had caught fire three times in four months. A 1967 article in The New Yorker by John Brooks detailed the relationship between the office secretary and the copier. A secretary he had interviewed for the piece said that a technical representative from Xerox had warned her "not to be afraid of the 914 because the machine would sense her fear and, like a mischievous child, misbehave." Despite these problems, the machine was regarded with affection by its operators, due to it being complex enough to be interesting to use, but without being so complex as to be beyond understanding.

The pricing structure of the machine was designed to encourage customers to rent rather than buy: it could be rented in 1965 for $25 per month, plus 10 cents per copy. There was a meter, which the customer would read to fill out and mail a card to Xerox each month. Its purchase price was $27,500, which was established by the US Government, as they would not rent equipment. The customer also bought paper and toner (ink) at a cost of about 5 cents per copy.

== Sales ==
The Xerox 914 was produced between 1960 and 1977. It was introduced to the public on September 16, 1959, in a demonstration at the Sherry-Netherland Hotel in New York, shown on live television. One of the two copiers that were present that day caught fire.

The 914 was one of the most successful Xerox products ever, and was a significant component of Xerox's revenues in the mid-1960s, with one author estimating that the machine accounted for two thirds of the company's revenue in 1965, with income generated of $243M.

The second television commercial produced by Xerox for the 914 featured a trained chimpanzee using the copier. The day after the commercial debuted, the company received calls from angry customers complaining of co-workers leaving bananas on the copier and suggesting that a monkey could do their jobs. The commercial was taken off the air.

== Legacy ==
The company's subsequent models were the Xerox 720, the Xerox 1000, the Xerox 813, the Xerox 2400, 3600,and 7000. One writer has assessed that the popularity of the machine has had a number of lasting impacts, such as university courses switching from reading lists of single chapters from several books, each of which needed to be purchased by the student, to requiring the students to purchase a single compilation of those chapters produced by local copy shops.

== In popular culture ==
The arrival of a Xerox 914 is a cultural signifier in the second season of Mad Men, set in a 1962 Manhattan advertising agency. It is acquired specifically to impress a potential client with how modern the agency is.

In the 2017 film The Post, Daniel Ellsberg, portrayed by Matthew Rhys, is seen using a Xerox 914 to copy the Pentagon Papers.
