= Charles Peter McColough =

American businessman and politician

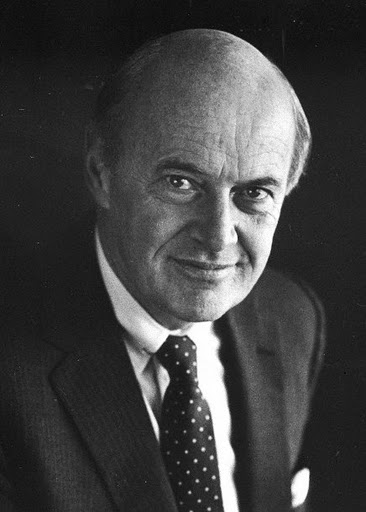

Treasurer of the Democratic National Committee
- In office January 8, 1973 – September 1974
- Preceded by: Howard Weingrow
- Succeeded by: Edward Bennett Williams

Personal details
- Born: August 1, 1922 Halifax, Nova Scotia, Canada
- Died: December 13, 2006 (aged 84) Greenwich, Connecticut, U.S.
- Occupation: businessman

Charles Peter Philip Paul McColough (August 1, 1922 – December 13, 2006) was a Canadian-American businessman who served as the chief executive officer and chairman of the Xerox Corporation. He retired in the late 1980s, after serving over fourteen years as CEO, which included the founding of Xerox PARC. Aside from his tenure at Xerox, McColough was also treasurer of the Democratic National Committee between 1973 and 1974, was chairman of United Way of America, and served on the Board of Trustees at the Council on Foreign Relations, New York Stock Exchange, Bank of New York, Wachovia, Citigroup, Knight Ridder, and Union Carbide Corporation.

C. Peter McColough is also the namesake of the C. Peter McColough Roundtable Series on International Economics, part of the Council on Foreign Relations. This program was enacted and funded by the Council on Foreign Relations upon McColough's retirement as a director on the council's Board for nine years. McColough also served as Treasurer between 1985 and 1987, Chairman of the Finance and Budget Committee between 1981 and 1987, and served as chairman of the Campaign for the Council between 1983 and 1985.

He resided with his wife, Mary Virginia White McColough, in Greenwich, Connecticut, and Palm Beach, Florida.

== Family ==
C. Peter McColough was born in Halifax, Nova Scotia, Canada. He was the first-born child of the late Dr. Reginald Walker McColough, and the late Barbara Theresa Martin. Reginald McColough was a director of public works for the Parliament of Canada, and was responsible for the modernization and development of Cape Breton Island in northern Nova Scotia. His paternal family descended from Godfrey McCulloch of Scotland, and was a distant relation of Sir Walter Scott. After attendance at Halifax private schools, McColough enrolled at Dalhousie University, and graduated in 1943; he eventually received an honorary degree from Dalhousie later in life. After Dalhousie, McColough studied at Osgoode Law School in Toronto, and finally at the Harvard Business School, after briefly serving in the British Navy in World War II. McColough graduated from Harvard Business School in 1949, and became a US citizen in 1956.

While living and working in Philadelphia, Pennsylvania, McColough met and married socialite Mary Virginia White, daughter of James J. White II, CEO of J.J. White Incorporated, one of the largest family-owned businesses in the East Coast of the United States that is still in operation today. They had five children: Peter McColough (died 1987), Andrew McColough, Virginia McColough Keeshan, Ian McColough, and Robert McColough (died 1999). The family lived in Rochester, New York until McColough moved Xerox headquarters to Stamford, Connecticut, and then resided in the nearby suburb of Greenwich, Connecticut. McColough additionally had seven grandchildren: Alexander McColough, Charles McColough, Austin McColough, Peter McColough, Caroline Keeshan, Paul Keeshan, and Katherine McColough.

== Career ==
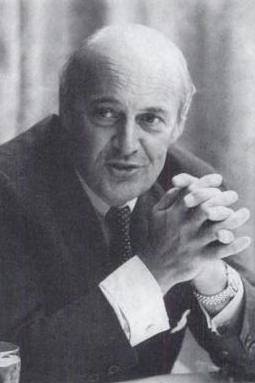
Photo of the late C. Peter McColough, CEO of the Xerox Corporation.

McColough worked initially for Lehigh Navigation Coal Sales Company in the USA before making the switch in 1954 to Xerox, then a little-known manufacturer of industrial photocopiers and still known as the Haloid Company. Five years after that career move, his new firm introduced its first office photocopier. As one of the first companies to step into the lucrative arena and potential growth market, Xerox's annual revenues soared from $40 million in 1960 to almost $3 billion in the early 1970s.

After taking over the presidency of the firm in 1966, McColough significantly changed and altered the direction and goals of Xerox Corporation. By 1979, McColough had built up Xerox revenues to $7 billion a year and its annual earnings to $563 million. The company's chief scientist told Forbes Magazine in 1980 that "in the late 1960s, Peter McColough redefined our company." From 1970 through to the mid-1980s he has held several directorships and in 1970, was honoured by his former alma mater, Dalhousie University, with an Honorary Doctorate.

== Assessments ==
The consensus of various business and economic journalists is that McColough as CEO was a restless, energetic but amiable man who had little time for memos, letters and meetings that normally make up the routine of daily corporate life. Despite a well-off upbringing, McColough worked himself from an executive salesperson of Haloid to a chairman and CEO of Xerox.

McColough's philosophy was always one of strong leadership by example. He explained once to Business Week that "a company is made not only by the quality of its products and services, but also by its people, especially its top people," and in doing so revealed the key to his business career. On May 2, 1968, McColough and his partner Joseph C. Wilson sent out a memo announcing the company intended to start an affirmative action program, making Xerox one of the first companies to do so. McColough and Xerox have been both praised and criticized for it.

McColough started the PARC (Palo Alto Research Center), meant to operate something like AT&T's Bell Labs. PARC researchers developed pioneering commercial products in the field of personal computers—such as the Alto personal computer, GUI (graphical user interface), the WYSIWYG (What You See Is What You Get) editor, the first commercial mouse, Ethernet network architecture, OOP (object-oriented programming), PDL (Page Description Language), Internet protocols, and laser printing. But McColough and Xerox have been criticized for failing to take advantage of the opportunities PARC provided. "In spite of being a veritable cradle of innovation during the formative years of personal computing and the Internet, PARC rarely convinced Xerox to take its ideas from laboratory prototypes to commercially successful products," stated an article about PARC at the "Smart Computing in Plain English" Website. "Many of the products were taken up successfully by other companies."

== Death and legacy ==
McColough died on December 13, 2006, after a long illness, according to his son Andrew McColough. His funeral took place in Greenwich, Connecticut, and was highly covered by international media outlets. Among those who gave eulogies were Vernon Jordan, a longtime friend and colleague, and David T. Kearns, another longtime friend who took over the reins at Xerox after McColough retired. He was survived by his wife, three children, seven grandchildren, and a sister, Patricia McColough Wallace of Halifax, Nova Scotia.

Business positions
Preceded by Joseph C. Wilson	President of Xerox Corporation; 1966–1971	Succeeded by Archie R. McCardell
Preceded by Joseph C. Wilson	CEO of Xerox Corporation; 1968–1982	Succeeded by David T. Kearns
Preceded by Joseph C. Wilson	Chairman of Xerox Corporation; December 13, 1971–1985	Succeeded by David T. Kearns
