= Xerography =

Dry photocopying technique

Schematic drawing of the xerographic photocopying process

Xerography (from the Greek roots ξηρός xeros, meaning "dry" and -‍γραφία -‍graphia, meaning "writing") is a technique of printing and photocopying. Originally called electrophotography, it was renamed to emphasize that it uses no liquid chemicals, unlike reproduction techniques then in use such as cyanotype.

== History ==
Xerography was invented by American physicist Chester Carlson, based significantly on contributions by Hungarian physicist Pál Selényi. Carlson applied for and was awarded U.S. patent 2,297,691 on October 6, 1942.

Carlson's innovation combined electrostatic printing with photography, unlike the dry electrostatic printing process invented by Georg Christoph Lichtenberg in 1778. Carlson's original process was cumbersome, requiring several manual processing steps with flat plates.

In 1946, Carlson signed an agreement with Haloid Photographic Company to develop it as a commercial product. Before that year, Carlson had proposed his idea to more than a dozen companies, but none was interested. Haloid's president, Joseph C. Wilson, saw the promise of Carlson's invention, and saw to it that Haloid diligently worked to produce a working commercial product.

It was almost 18 years before a fully automated process was developed, the key breakthrough being the use of a cylindrical drum coated with selenium instead of a flat plate. This resulted in the first commercial automatic copier, the Xerox 914, being released by Haloid/Xerox in 1960.

Xerography is now used in most photocopying machines and in laser and LED printers.

== Process ==
The first commercial use was hand processing of a flat photosensor (an electrostatic component that detects the presence of visible light) with a copy camera and a separate processing unit to produce offset lithographic plates.

By using a cylinder to carry the photosensor, automatic processing was enabled. In 1960, the automatic photocopier was created and many millions have been built since. Today this technology is used in photocopiers, computer laser printers and LED printers, microform printers and even digital presses which are slowly replacing many traditional offset presses in the printing industry for shorter runs.

A metal cylinder called the drum is mounted to rotate about a horizontal axis. The drum rotates at the speed of paper output. One revolution passes the drum surface through the steps described below.

The end-to-end dimension is the width of print to be produced plus a generous tolerance. The drums in the copiers originally developed by Xerox Corporation were manufactured with a surface coating of amorphous selenium (more recently ceramic or organic photoconductor), applied by vacuum deposition. Amorphous selenium will hold an electrostatic charge in darkness and will conduct away such a charge under light. In the original system, photocopiers that rely on silicon or selenium (and its alloys) are charged positively in use (hence work with negatively charged "toner" powder). In the 1970s, IBM Corporation sought to avoid Xerox's patents for selenium drums by developing organic photoconductors as an alternative to the selenium drum. Photoconductors using organic compounds are electrochemically charged vice versa to the preceding system in order to exploit their native properties in printing. Organic photoconductors are now preferred because they can be deposited on a flexible, oval or triangular, belt instead of a round drum, facilitating significantly smaller device size.

Laser printer photo drums are made with a doped silicon diode sandwich structure with a hydrogen-doped silicon light-chargeable layer, a boron nitride rectifying (diode-causing) layer that minimizes current leakage, and a surface layer of silicon doped with oxygen or nitrogen; silicon nitride is a scuff-resistant material.

The steps of the process are described below as applied on a cylinder, as in a photocopier. Some variants are described within the text. Every step of the process has design variants. The physics of the xerographic process are discussed at length in a book.

=== Step 1: charging ===
An electrostatic charge of −600 volts is uniformly distributed over the surface of the drum by a corona discharge from a corona unit (Corotron), with output limited by a control grid or screen. This effect can also be achieved by using a contact roller with a charge applied to it. Essentially, a corona discharge is generated by a very thin wire 1/4 to 1/2 inch (6 to 13 mm) away from the photoconductor. A negative charge is placed on the wire, which will ionize the space between the wire and conductor, so electrons will be repelled and pushed away onto the conductor. The conductor is set on top of a conducting surface, kept at ground potential.

The polarity is chosen to suit the positive or negative process. Positive process is used for producing black on white copies. Negative process is used for producing black on white from negative originals (mainly microfilm) and all digital printing and copying. This is to economize on the use of laser light by the "blackwriting" or "write to black" exposure method.

=== Step 2: exposure ===
The document or microform to be copied is illuminated by flash lamps on the platen and either passed over a lens or scanned by a moving light and lens, such that its image is projected onto and synchronized with the moving drum surface. Alternatively, the image may be exposed using a xenon strobe illuminating the surface of the moving drum or belt, fast enough to render a perfect latent image. Where there is text or image on the document, the corresponding area of the drum will remain unlit. Where there is no image the drum will be illuminated and the charge will be dissipated. The charge that remains on the drum after this exposure is a 'latent' image and is a negative of the original document.

Whether in a scanning or a stationary optical system, combinations of lenses and mirrors are used to project the original image on the platen (scanning surface) onto the photoconductor. Additional lenses, with different focal lengths or zooming lenses are utilized to enlarge or reduce the image; the scanning speed must adapt to elements or reductions.

A drum is inferior to a belt in the sense that although it is simpler than a belt, it must be buffered gradually in parts rolling on the curved drum, while the flat belt efficiently uses one exposure to make a direct passage.

In a laser or LED printer, modulated light is projected onto the drum surface to create the latent image. The modulated light is used only to create the positive image, hence the term "blackwriting".

=== Step 3: development ===
In high-volume copiers, the drum is presented with a slowly turbulent mixture of toner particles and larger, iron, reusable carrier particles. Toner is a powder; its early form was carbon powder, then melt-mixed with a polymer. The carrier particles have a coating which, during agitation, generates a triboelectric charge (a form of static electricity), which attracts a coating of toner particles. In addition, the mix is manipulated with a magnetic roller to present to the surface of the drum or belt a brush of toner. By contact with the carrier each neutral toner particle has an electric charge of polarity opposite to the charge of the latent image on the drum. The charge attracts toner to form a visible image on the drum. To control the amount of toner transferred, a bias voltage is applied to the developer roller to counteract the attraction between toner and latent image.

Where a negative image is required, as when printing from a microform negative, then the toner has the same polarity as the corona in step 1. Electrostatic lines of force drive the toner particles away from the latent image towards the uncharged area, which is the area exposed from the negative.

Early color copiers and printers used multiple copy cycles for each page output, using colored filters and toners. Modern units use only a single scan to four separate, miniature process units, operating simultaneously, each with its own coronas, drum and developer unit.

=== Step 4: transfer ===
Paper is passed between the drum and the transfer corona, which has a polarity that is the opposite of the charge on the toner. The toner image is transferred from the drum to the paper by a combination of pressure and electrostatic attraction. On many color and high-speed machines, it is common to replace the transfer corona with one or more charged bias transfer rollers, which apply greater pressure and produce a higher quality image.

=== Step 5: separation, or detack ===
Electric charges on the paper are partially neutralized by AC from a second corona, usually constructed in tandem with the transfer corona and immediately after it. As a result, the paper, complete with most (but not all) of the toner image, is separated from the drum or belt surface.

=== Step 6: fixing, or fusing ===
The toner image is permanently fixed to the paper using either a heat and pressure mechanism (hot roll fuser) or a radiant fusing technology (oven fuser) to melt and bond the toner particles into the medium (usually paper) being printed. There also used to be available "offline" vapor fusers. These were trays covered in cotton gauze sprinkled with a volatile liquid, such as ether. When the transferred image was brought into proximity with the vapor from the evaporating liquid, the result was a perfectly fixed copy without any of the distortion or toner migration which can occur with the other methods. This method is no longer used due to emissions of fumes.

=== Step 7: cleaning ===
The drum, having already been partially discharged during detack, is further discharged by light. Any remaining toner, that did not transfer in step 6, is removed from the drum surface by a rotating brush under suction, or a squeegee known as the cleaning blade. This 'waste' toner usually is routed into a waste toner compartment for later disposal; however, in some systems, it is routed back into the developer unit for reuse. This process, known as toner reclaim, is much more economical, but can possibly lead to a reduced overall toner efficiency through a process known as 'toner polluting' whereby concentration levels of toner/developer having poor electrostatic properties are permitted to build up in the developer unit, reducing the overall efficiency of the toner in the system.

=== Variations ===
Some systems have abandoned the separate developer (carrier). These systems, known as monocomponent, operate as above, but use either a magnetic toner or fusible developer. There is no need to replace worn-out developer, as the user effectively replaces it along with the toner. An alternative developing system, developed by KIP from an abandoned line of research by Xerox, completely replaces magnetic toner manipulation and the cleaning system, with a series of computer-controlled, varying biases. The toner is printed directly onto the drum, by direct contact with a rubber developing roller which, by reversing the bias, removes all the unwanted toner and returns it to the developer unit for reuse.

The development of xerography has led to new technologies that have the potential to eventually eradicate traditional offset printing machines. These new machines that print in full CMYK color, such as Xeikon, use xerography but provide nearly the quality of traditional ink prints.

== Durability ==
Xerographic documents (and the closely related laser printer printouts) can have excellent archival durability, depending on the quality of the paper used. If low-quality paper is used, it can yellow and degrade due to residual acid in the untreated pulp; in the worst case, old copies can literally crumble into small particles when handled. High-quality xerographic copies on acid-free paper can last as long as typewritten or handwritten documents on the same paper. However, xerographic copies are vulnerable to undesirable toner transfer if they are stored in direct contact or close proximity to plasticizers, which are present in looseleaf binders made with PVC. In extreme cases, the ink toner will stick directly to the binder cover, pulling away from the paper copy and rendering it illegible.

== Uses in animation ==
Ub Iwerks adapted xerography to eliminate the hand-inking stage in the animation process by printing the animator's drawings directly to the animation cels. The first animated feature film to use this process was One Hundred and One Dalmatians (1961), although the technique was already tested in Sleeping Beauty, released two years earlier. At first, only black lines were possible, but in 1977, gray lines were introduced and used in The Rescuers and in the 1980s, colored lines were introduced and used in animated features like The Secret of NIMH.

== Uses in art ==
Xerography has been used by photographers internationally as a direct imaging photographic process, by book artists for publishing one-of-a-kind books or multiples, and by collaborating artists in portfolios such as those produced by the International Society of Copier Artists founded by American printmaker and book artist, Louise Odes Neaderland. Art critic Roy Proctor said of artist/curator Louise Neaderland during her residency for the exhibition Art ex Machina at 1708 Gallery in Richmond, Virginia, "She's living proof that, when a new technology begins to be mass-produced, artists will be curious enough—and imaginative enough—to explore its creative uses.
