= Louise Odes Neaderland =

American artist (1932–2022)

- Born: August 23, 1932; New York City, U.S.
- Died: December 30, 2022 (aged 90)
- Education: Bard College, University of Iowa
- Occupations: Artist and Lecturer
- Known for: Founder and Director of International Society of Copier Artists (ISCA); Collator of ISCA Quarterly; Curator of ISCAGRAPHICS
- Movement: Xerox art, copy art
- Spouse: Ralph Neaderland (1926 - 2013)

Louise Odes Neaderland (August 23, 1932 – December 30, 2022) was an American photographer, printmaker, book artist and founder of the International Society of Copier Artists (I.S.C.A.) and the I.S.C.A. Quarterly, a collaborative mail, book art, and copy art publication. She was the organizer of ISCAGRAPHICS, a traveling exhibition of xerographic art.

== Early life ==
Neaderland was an alumna of Bard College (1954) and received a Master of Fine Arts degree in printmaking from the University of Iowa in 1957. In 1952, she was awarded a Yale University Norfolk Fellowship in Printmaking. In both 1960 and 1962 she received fellowship awards from the Huntington Hartford Foundation. In 1986 she was awarded a National Endowment for the Arts grant for artists' bookmaking.

== Career ==
Neaderland began using the photocopier for making art during a residency at Women's Studio Workshop, WSW, in 1982 and received a residency grant from WSW in 1982. By the 1980s she had gained international recognition in the field of xerography. In 1982, Neaderland founded the International Society of Copier Artists in New York City[]. She is the author/artist of many xerographic limited edition books, some of which are still available to private collectors. Later books by Neaderland include Where Could the Dark Matter Be? and a compilation, Original Contributions, of her original pages contributed to the International Society of Copier Artists ISCA portfolios.

=== Collections ===
Neaderland's art is represented in Special Collections of MOMA, the Metropolitan Museum of Art, Getty Center, Brooklyn Museum of Art, Sackner Archive of Concrete and Visual Poetry in Miami, Florida, and Jaffee Center of Art Book Art. Her books are included in the book art collection at Harvard University Library and in the Sydney, Australia collection Bibliotheca Librorum Apud Artificem. Neaderland continues to direct ISCA and publish the ISCA Quarterly, of which one issue a year is dedicated to bookworks. 'this annual 'box of books' is a favorite of both artists and collectors. More than a dozen museums and educational institutions subscribed to the I.S.C.A. Quarterly, helping to establish xerography as a legitimate art form. The Quarterly is thought to be the longest running international art assemblage project in the history of such collaborative projects. Examples of her book art and that of other collaborators in the I.S.C.A. Quarterlies book art editions are in the Special Collections and Archives of the James Branch Cabell Library on the Monroe Campus of Virginia Commonwealth University.

Neaderland donated a complete set of I.S.C.A. Quarterlies to Bard College at Simon's Rock in Great Barrington, Massachusetts, along with copies of all of her books, 62 in all. The Special Collections department at the University of Iowa in Iowa City has an archive of I.S.C.A. xerographic art. Neaderland continues to make books, and she has created a book which is a catalog of her books. For thirty-five years she has used the photocopy machine as a creative tool, editioning prints and artists' books under the imprint (also known as the imprimatur) of Bone Hollow Arts, located in Brooklyn, New York.

Some of Neaderland's works include Pandora's Box: 12 artists' books, The Nuclear Fan, and Force Grim Force: Violence is Legitimate Politics. Force Grim Force shows a picture of a Peruvian woman passing a Peruvian government soldier who is on patrol in Ayachucho, Peru.

=== Critical reception ===
Joanna Scott, a writer for Afterimage, discussed the "idiosyncratic appearances of artists' books," which she thought might confound a reader/viewer unfamiliar with the content of two of the ISCA quarterlies, ISCA Quarterly: First Annual Bookworks Edition and ISCA Quarterly: Second Annual Bookworks Edition. In addition, Scott categorized and reviewed the ISCA photocopy books according to their diverse forms (matchbooks, stamp books, scrolls, miniature calendars, slides, wallets, and envelopes), and according to their content (". . .self helps, which offer moral advice; narratives, composed of broken or progressives successions of images; anthologies, which collect borrowed images or parodies of familiar images; pattern pieces, a catchall category for works that use original images in nonnarrative form; and ideologues, which announce their purpose outright."

In 1991 Tom Trusky, Director of the Idaho Center for the Book, interviewed and videotaped Neaderland in her studio at 800 West End Avenue in NYC, where her studio was located from 1967-1994. Roy Proctor, art critic for the Richmond News-Leader, said of Neaderland in a 1990 review of the exhibition Art ex Machina at 1708 Gallery, then located in Shockoe Bottom in Richmond, Virginia, "She's living proof that, when a new technology begins to be mass-produced, artists will be curious enough--and imaginative enough--to explore its creative uses." In 1994 Proctor also reviewed Art ex Libris, a curated invitational exhibition of artist's books, including books by Neaderland, at Artspace in Richmond, Virginia, then on Broad Street in Richmond Virginia. Artspace received a Virginia Commission for the Arts Technical Assistance Grant to produce video documentation of all the exhibited books in Art ex Libris, including those by Neaderland.

A short history of Xerox art in Fungiculture Journal profiles Neaderland and the development of the ISCA Quarterly in sections called "Laziness and the Invention of Tools" and "When the Muzak Ends."

She experimented with various book art formats using xerographic processes, and Neaderland's books had a wide viewing audience in various fluxus and specific thematic or conceptual art shows, for example an exhibition featuring flip books.

Neaderland died on December 30, 2022, at the age of 90 from Alzheimer's Disease.
