= International Society of Copier Artists =

The International Society of Copier Artists (I.S.C.A) was a non-profit group founded by Louise Neaderland in 1981, intended to promote the work of photocopier artists who used the copier as a camera with which to scan and print original and experimental signed limited-edition compositions. I.S.C.A advocated for the recognition of copier art as a legitimate art form. The group is best known for producing The I.S.C.A Quarterly as well as for coordinating exhibitions of xerographic artwork, and the distribution of "The I.S.C.A Newsletter". Women made up the majority of the society's membership.

== The I.S.C.A Quarterly ==
The I.S.C.A. Quarterly was published from 1982 to 2003. Typically, issues were produced in limited editions of 200 copies, with an average of 45 pages of original copier art supplied by I.S.C.A. members. Over the years the form of the Quarterly mutated from a collection of unbound pages to a spiral bound journal with an Annual Bookworks Edition composed of a box of books made by I.S.C.A. members. The work produced for the Quarterly ranged widely in focus from social and political issues to personal and emotional themes. The final issue (Volume 21, #4) was published in June 2003.
