= Chester Carlson =

American physicist and inventor (1906–1968)

Chester Floyd Carlson
- Born: February 8, 1906; Seattle, Washington, United States
- Died: September 19, 1968 (aged 62); New York City, New York, United States
- Education: San Bernardino High School; Riverside Junior College; California Institute of Technology; New York Law School
- Known for: Invention of xerography
- Scientific career
- Fields: Electrophotography / Xerography
- Workplaces: Bell Labs; Battelle Memorial Institute; Xerox

Chester Floyd Carlson (February 8, 1906 – September 19, 1968) was an American physicist, inventor, and patent attorney born in Seattle, Washington.

Carlson invented electrophotography (now xerography, meaning "dry writing"), producing a dry copy in contrast to the wet copies then produced by the Photostat process; it is now used by millions of photocopiers worldwide.

== Early life ==
Work outside of school hours was a necessity at an early age, and with such time as I had I turned toward interests of my own devising, making things, experimenting, and planning for the future. I had read of Thomas Alva Edison and other successful inventors, and the idea of making an invention appealed to me as one of the few available means to accomplish a change in one's economic status, while at the same time bringing to focus my interest in technical things and making it possible to make a contribution to society as well.

— Chester Carlson,

Carlson's father, Olaf Adolph Carlson, had little formal education, but was described as "brilliant" by a relative. Carlson wrote of his mother, Ellen, that she "was looked up to by her sisters as one of the wisest."

When Carlson was an infant, his father contracted tuberculosis, and also later suffered from arthritis of the spine (a common, age-related disease). When Olaf moved the family to Mexico for a seven-month period in 1910, in hopes of gaining riches through what Carlson described as "a crazy American land colonization scheme," Ellen contracted malaria. Because of his parents' illnesses, and the resulting poverty, Carlson worked to support his family from an early age; he began working odd jobs for money when he was eight. By the time he was thirteen, he would work for two or three hours before going to school, then go back to work after classes. By the time Carlson was in high school, he was his family's principal provider. His mother died of tuberculosis when he was 17, and his father died when Carlson was 27.

Carlson began thinking about reproducing print early in his life. At age ten, he created a newspaper called "This and That", created by hand and circulated among his friends with a routing list. His favorite plaything was a rubber stamp printing set, and his most coveted possession was a toy typewriter an aunt gave him for Christmas in 1916—although he was disappointed that it was not an office typewriter.

While working for a local printer while in high school, Carlson attempted to typeset and publish a magazine for science-minded students like himself. He quickly became frustrated with traditional duplicating techniques. As he said in a 1965 interview, "That set me to thinking about easier ways to do that, and I got to thinking about duplicating methods."

== Education ==
Well, I had a fascination with the graphic arts from childhood. One of the first things I wanted was a typewriter—even when I was in grammar school. Then, when I was in high school I liked chemistry and I got the idea of publishing a little magazine for amateur chemists. I also worked for a printer in my spare time and he sold me an old printing press which he had discarded. I paid for it by working for him. Then I started out to set my own type and print this little paper. I don't think I printed more than two issues, and they weren't much. However, this experience did impress me with the difficulty of getting words into hard copy and this, in turn, started me thinking about duplicating processes. I started a little inventor's notebook and I would jot down ideas from time to time.

— Chester Carlson, to A. Dinsdale, when asked about his choice of field

Because of the work he put into supporting his family, Carlson had to take a postgraduate year at his alma mater San Bernardino High School to fill in missed courses. He then entered a cooperative work/study program at Riverside Junior College, working and going to classes in alternating six-week periods. Carlson held three jobs while at Riverside, paying for a cheap one-bedroom apartment for himself and his father. At Riverside, Chester began as a chemistry major, but switched to physics, largely due to a favorite professor.

After three years at Riverside, Chester transferred to the California Institute of Technology, or Caltech—his ambition since high school. His tuition, $260 a year, exceeded his total earnings, and the workload prevented him from earning much money—though he did mow lawns and do odd jobs on weekends, and work at a cement factory in the summer. By the time he graduated, he was $1,500 in debt. He graduated with good—but not exceptional—grades, earning a B.S. degree in physics in 1930, at the beginning of the Great Depression. He wrote letters seeking employment to 82 companies; none offered him a job.

== Early career ==
The need for a quick, satisfactory copying machine that could be used right in the office seemed very apparent to me—there seemed such a crying need for it—such a desirable thing if it could be obtained. So I set out to think of how one could be made.

— Chester Carlson

As a last resort, he began working for Bell Telephone Laboratories in New York City as a research engineer. Finding the work dull and routine, after a year Carlson transferred to the patent department as an assistant to one of the company's patent attorneys.

Carlson wrote over 400 ideas for new inventions in his personal notebooks while working at Bell Labs. He kept coming back to his love of printing, especially since his job in the patent department gave him new determination to find a better way to copy documents. "In the course of my patent work," wrote Carlson, "I frequently had need for copies of patent specifications and drawings, and there was no really convenient way of getting them at that time." At the time, the department primarily made copies by having typists retype the patent application in its entirety, using carbon paper to make multiple copies at once. There were other methods available, such as mimeographs and Photostats, but they were more expensive than carbon paper, and they had other limitations that made them impractical. The existing solutions were 'duplicating' machines—they could make many duplicates, but one had to create a special master copy first, usually at great expense of time or money. Carlson wanted to invent a 'copying' machine, that could take an existing document and copy it onto a new piece of paper without any intermediate steps.

In 1933, during the Great Depression, Carlson was fired from Bell Labs for participating in a failed "business scheme" outside of the Labs with several other employees. After six weeks of job-hunting, he got a job at the firm Austin & Dix, near Wall Street, but he left the job about a year later as the firm's business was declining. He got a better job at the electronics firm P. R. Mallory Company, founded by Philip Mallory (which became the Duracell division of Procter & Gamble), where Carlson was promoted to head of the patent department.

== The invention of electrophotography ==
There was a gap of some years, but by 1935 I was more or less settled. I had my job, but I didn't think I was getting ahead very fast. I was just living from hand to mouth, you might say, and I had just got married. It was kind of a hard struggle. So I thought the possibility of making an invention might kill two birds with one stone; it would be a chance to do the world some good and also a chance to do myself some good.

— Chester Carlson, to A. Dinsdale

In 1936, Carlson began to study law at night at New York Law School, receiving his LL.B. degree in 1939. He studied at the New York Public Library, copying longhand from law books there because he could not afford to buy them. The pains induced by this laborious copying hardened his resolve to find a way to build a true copying machine. He began supplementing his law studies with trips to the Public Library's science and technology department. It was there that he was inspired by a brief article, written by Hungarian physicist Pál Selényi in an obscure German scientific journal, that showed him a way to obtain his dream machine.

Carlson's early experiments, conducted in his apartment kitchen, were smoky, smelly, and occasionally explosive. In one set of experiments, he was melting pure crystalline sulfur (a photoconductor) onto a plate of zinc by moving it just so over the flame of his kitchen stove. This often resulted in a sulfur fire, filling the building with the smell of rotten eggs. In another experiment, the chemicals he was working with caught fire, and he and his wife were hard-pressed to extinguish the flames.

During this period, he developed arthritis of the spine, like his father. He pressed on with his experiments, however, in addition to his law school studies and his regular job.

Having learned about the value of patents in his early career as a patent clerk and attorney, Carlson patented his developments every step along the way. He filed his first preliminary patent application on October 18, 1937.

By the fall of 1938, Carlson's wife had convinced him that his experiments needed to be conducted elsewhere. He rented a room on the second floor of a house owned by his mother-in-law at 32-05 37th Street in Astoria, Queens. He hired an assistant, Otto Kornei, an out-of-work Austrian physicist.

Carlson knew that several major corporations were researching ways of copying paper. The Haloid Company had the Photostat, which it licensed to Eastman Kodak, the photography giant. However, these companies were researching along photographic lines, and their solutions required special chemicals and papers. The Photostat, for instance, was essentially a photograph of the document being copied.

=== Electrophotography ===
Selényi's article described a way of transmitting and printing facsimiles of printed images using a beam of ions directed onto a rotating drum of insulating material. The ions would create an electrostatic charge on the drum. A fine powder could then be dusted upon the drum; the powder would stick to the parts of the drum that had been charged, much as a balloon will stick to a static-charged stocking.

To this point, Carlson's apartment-kitchen experiments in constructing a copying machine had involved trying to generate an electric current in the original piece of paper using light. Selényi's article convinced Carlson to instead use light to 'remove' the static charge from a uniformly-ionized photoconductor. As no light would reflect from the black marks on the paper, those areas would remain charged on the photoconductor, and would therefore retain the fine powder. He could then transfer the powder to a fresh sheet of paper, resulting in a duplicate of the original. This approach would give his invention an advantage over the Photostat, which could create only a photographic negative of the original.

The world's first xerographic image

On October 22, 1938, they had their historic breakthrough. Kornei wrote the words "10.-22.-38 ASTORIA." in India ink on a glass microscope slide. He prepared a zinc plate with a sulfur coating, darkened the room, rubbed the sulfur surface with a cotton handkerchief to apply an electrostatic charge, then laid the slide on the plate, exposing it to a bright, incandescent light. They removed the slide, sprinkled lycopodium powder to the sulfur surface, softly blew the excess away, and transferred the image to a sheet of wax paper. They heated the paper, softening the wax so the lycopodium would adhere to it, and had the world's first xerographic copy. After repeating the experiment to be sure it worked, Carlson celebrated by taking Kornei out for a modest lunch.

Kornei was not as excited about the results of the experiment as Carlson. Within a year, he left Carlson on cordial terms. His pessimism about electrophotography was so strong that he decided to dissolve his agreement with Carlson that would have given Kornei ten percent of Carlson's future proceeds from the invention and partial rights to the inventions they had worked on together. Years later, when Xerox stock was soaring, Carlson sent Kornei a gift of one hundred shares in the company. Had Kornei held onto that gift, it would have been worth more than $1 million by 1972.

The road to Carlson's success—or that for xerography's success—had been long and filled with failure. He was turned down for funding by more than twenty companies between 1939 and 1944. He tried for some time to sell the invention to International Business Machines (IBM), the great vendor of office equipment, but no one at the company saw merit in the concept—it is not clear that anyone at IBM even 'understood' the concept. His next-to-last attempt to garner the interest—and funds—he needed to commercialize the physics was a meeting with the Department of the Navy. The Navy had a specific interest in the production of dry copies, but they did not "see" what Carlson saw.

On October 6, 1942, the Patent Office issued Carlson's patent on electrophotography.

=== Battelle Memorial Institute ===
When Carlson was close to giving up on getting his invention from a proof-of-concept to a usable product, happenstance provided a solution. In 1944, Russell W. Dayton, a young engineer from the Battelle Memorial Institute in Columbus, Ohio, visited the patent department at Mallory where Carlson worked. Dayton, brought in as an expert witness in a patent appeal case by Mallory, seemed to Carlson to be "the kind of fellow who looked like he was interested in new ideas." Although Battelle had not previously developed ideas generated by others, Dayton was fascinated by Carlson's invention. When Carlson was invited to Columbus to demonstrate his invention, Dayton's statement to the Battelle scientists and engineers present showed that he understood the importance of Carlson's invention: "However crude this may seem, this is the first time any of you have seen a reproduction made without any chemical reaction and a dry process."

Battelle took a risk on Carlson's invention, which seemed to come out of nowhere:

Electrophotography had practically no foundation in previous scientific work. Chet put together a rather odd lot of phenomena, each of which was obscure in itself and none of which had previously been related in anyone's thinking. The result was the biggest thing in imaging since the coming of photography itself. Furthermore, he did it entirely without the help of a favorable scientific climate. There are dozens of instances of simultaneous discovery down through scientific history, but no one came anywhere near being simultaneous with Chet. I'm as amazed by his discovery now as I was when I first heard of it.

— Dr. Harold E. Clark, Battelle Memorial Institute, New Yorker, 1967

By the fall of 1945, Battelle agreed to act as Carlson's agent for his patents, pay for further research, and develop the idea. Battelle tried to interest major printing and photography companies, like Eastman Kodak and Harris-Seybold, to license the idea, but to no avail.

=== Haloid Company ===
The commercial breakthrough came when John Dessauer, chief of research at the Haloid Company, read an article about Carlson's invention. Haloid, a manufacturer of photographic paper, was looking for a way out of the shadow of its Rochester, New York, neighbor, Eastman Kodak. Through previous acquisitions, Haloid was already in the duplicating-machine business; Dessauer thought that electrophotography might allow Haloid to expand into a new field that Kodak did not dominate.

In December 1946, Battelle, Carlson, and Haloid signed the first agreement to license electrophotography for a commercial product. The $10,000 contract—representing ten percent of Haloid's total earnings from 1945—granted a nonexclusive right to make electrophotography-based copying machines intended to make no more than twenty copies of an original. Both sides were tentative; Battelle was concerned by Haloid's relatively small size, and Haloid had concerns about electrophotography's viability.

During this period, Battelle conducted most of the basic research into electrophotography, while Haloid concentrated on trying to make a commercial product out of the results. In 1948, Haloid's CEO, Joseph Wilson, convinced the U.S. Army Signal Corps to invest $100,000 in the technology, an amount that would double later. The Signal Corps was concerned about nuclear war. The traditional photographic techniques they used for reconnaissance would not function properly when exposed to the radiation from a nuclear attack; the film would fog, much as consumer photographic film can be fogged by an airport X-ray machine. The Signal Corps thought that electrophotography might be developed into a product that would be immune to such radiation. Through the 1950s, over half the money Battelle spent developing electrophotography came from government contracts.

In 1947, Carlson was becoming worried that Battelle was not developing electrophotography quickly enough; his patent would expire in ten years. After meeting with Joe Wilson, Carlson accepted an offer to become a consultant to Haloid. He and his wife Dorris moved to the Rochester area, to be near the company's base of operations.

After years of trying to interest additional licensees in electrophotography, Battelle agreed to renegotiate with Haloid, making it the exclusive licensee for the invention (except for a few minor uses that Battelle wished to retain for itself).

== Xerox ==
What Bell is to the telephone—or, more aptly, what Eastman is to photography—Haloid could be to xerography.

— Chester Carlson, letter to Joseph Wilson, 1953

=== Xerography ===
By 1948, Haloid realized that it would have to make a public announcement about electrophotography in order to retain its claims to the technology. However, the term electrophotography troubled Haloid; for one thing, its use of the term "photography" invited unwelcome comparisons with traditional duplicating technologies. After considering several options, Haloid chose a term invented by a public-relations employee at Battelle, who had asked a classics professor at Ohio State University for ideas. The professor suggested the term xerography—formed by combining the Greek words xeros ("dry") and graphein ("writing"). Carlson was not fond of the name, but Haloid's Wilson liked it, and so Haloid's board of directors voted to adopt it. The company's patent department wanted to trademark "xerography"; Haloid's head of sales and advertising, John Hartnett, vetoed the idea: "Don't do that. We want people to use the word."

=== XeroX Model A ===
On October 22, 1948, ten years to the day after that first microscope slide was copied, the Haloid Company made the first public announcement of xerography. In 1949, it shipped the first commercial photocopier: the XeroX Model A Copier, known inside the company as the "Ox Box." The Model A was difficult to use, requiring thirty-nine steps to make a copy, as the process was mostly manual. The product would likely have been a failure, except that it turned out to be a good way to make paper masters for offset printing presses, even with the difficulty of use. Sales of the Model A to the printing departments of companies like Ford Motor Company kept the product alive.

Before the Model A, in order to make a paper lithographic master for a lithographic press like the Multigraph 1250, one had two choices: Type up a new master using wax-coated carbon paper on a special master sheet, or use a metal plate coated with a modified silver halide photographic emulsion. If retyping the document was not feasible, the photographic method could be used, but it was slow, expensive, and messy. Because the Model A's toner repelled water but attracted oil-based inks, a lithographic master could be made easily by simply making a copy of the document with the Model A onto a blank paper master. It reduced the cost of creating a lithographic master for an existing document from three dollars to less than forty cents. Ford saved so much money by using the Model A that the savings were specifically mentioned in one of Ford's annual reports.

After the Model A, Haloid released a number of xerographic copiers to the market, but none yet particularly easy to use. Meanwhile, competitors such as Kodak and 3M brought out their own copying devices using other technologies. Kodak's Verifax, for instance, could sit on one side of a desk and sold for $100; Haloid's competing machines were more expensive and substantially larger.

=== Haloid Xerox ===
In 1955, Haloid signed a new agreement with Battelle granting it full title to Carlson's xerography patents, in exchange for fifty thousand shares of Haloid stock. Carlson received forty percent of the cash and stock from that deal, due to his agreement with Battelle. That same year, the British motion picture company Rank Organisation was looking for a product to sit alongside a small business it had making camera lenses. Thomas A Law, who was the head of that business, found his answer in a scientific magazine he picked up by chance. He read about an invention that could produce copies of documents as good as the original. Mr Law tracked down the backers – Haloid. In order to exploit those patents in Europe, Haloid partnered with the Rank Organisation in a joint venture called Rank Xerox. As photocopying took the world by storm, so did Rank's profits. According to Graham Dowson, later Rank's chief executive, it was "a stroke of luck that turned out to be a touch of genius … If Tom Law had not seen that magazine, we would not have known about xerography – or at least not before it was too late".

Haloid needed to grow, and its existing offices in Rochester were old and scattered. In 1955, the company purchased a large parcel of land in the Rochester suburb of Webster, New York; this site would eventually become the company's main research-and-development campus.

Haloid's CEO, Joseph Wilson, had decided Haloid needed a new name as early as 1954. After years of debate within the company, the board approved a name change to "Haloid Xerox" in 1958, reflecting the fact that xerography was now the company's main line of business.

=== The Xerox 914 ===
The first device recognizable as a modern photocopier was the Xerox 914. Although large and crude by modern standards, it allowed an operator to place an original on a sheet of glass, press a button, and receive a copy on plain paper. Manufactured in a leased building off Orchard Street in Rochester, the 914 was introduced to the market at the Sherry Netherland Hotel in New York City on September 16, 1959. Even plagued with early problems—of the two demonstration units at the hotel, one caught fire, and one worked fine—the Xerox 914 became massively successful. Between 1959, when the Model 914 first shipped, and 1961, Haloid Xerox's revenues nearly doubled.

The 914's success was not only due to its relative ease of use, its design (that, unlike competing copiers, carried no risk of damage to the original), and its low operating costs compared to other machines that required special paper; Haloid Xerox's decision to rent the 914—at the price of $25 per month, plus the cost of copies at four cents each with a minimum of $49 per month—made it vastly more affordable than a similar competing copier.

In 1961, because of the success of the Xerox 914, the company changed its name again, to Xerox Corporation.

For Carlson, the commercial success of the Xerox 914 was the culmination of his life's work: a device that could quickly and cheaply make an exact copy of an existing document. After the 914 went into production, Carlson's involvement with Xerox declined as he began pursuing his philanthropic interests.

== Personal life ==
In the fall of 1934, Carlson married Elsa von Mallon, whom he had met at a YWCA party in New York City. Carlson described the marriage as "an unhappy period interspersed with sporadic escapes." They were divorced in 1945.

Carlson married his second wife, Dorris Helen Hudgins, while the negotiations between Battelle and Haloid were under way.

== Later life ==
To know Chester Carlson was to like him, to love him, and to respect him. He was generally known as the inventor of xerography, and although it was an extraordinary achievement in the technological and scientific field, I respected him more as a man of exceptional moral stature and as a humanist. His concern for the future of the human situation was genuine, and his dedication to the principles of the United Nations was profound. He belonged to that rare breed of leaders who generate in our hearts faith in man and hope for the future.

— U Thant, secretary-general, United Nations, at the Xerox memorial service for Chester Carlson

In 1951, Carlson's royalties from Battelle amounted to about $15,000 (in current terms, $190,000). Carlson continued to work at Haloid until 1955, and he remained a consultant to the company until his death. From 1956 to 1965, he continued to earn royalties on his patents from Xerox, amounting to about one-sixteenth of a cent for every Xerox copy made worldwide.

In 1968, Fortune magazine ranked Carlson among the wealthiest people in America. He sent them a brief letter: "Your estimate of my net worth is too high by $150 million. I belong in the 0 to $50 million bracket." This was because Carlson had spent years quietly giving most of his fortune away. He told his wife his remaining ambition was "to die a poor man."

Carlson devoted his wealth to philanthropic purposes. He donated over $150 million to charitable causes and was an active supporter of the NAACP. Carlson's wife Dorris got him interested in Hinduism, particularly the ancient texts known as the Vedanta, as well as in Zen Buddhism. They hosted Buddhist meetings, with meditation, at their home. After reading Philip Kapleau's book The Three Pillars of Zen, Dorris invited Kapleau to join their meditation group; in June 1966, they provided the funding that allowed Kapleau to start the Rochester Zen Center. Dorris paid for 1,400 acres (5.7 km^{2}) of land that became Dai Bosatsu Zendo Kongo-ji, a Zen monastery in the Catskill Mountains of New York led by Eido Tai Shimano. Carlson had purchased a New York City carriage house for use by Shimano; he died four days after it was dedicated. Carlson is still commemorated in special services by Shimano; his dharma name, Daitokuin Zenshin Carlson Koji, is mentioned.

In his essay "Half a Career with the Paranormal," researcher Ian Stevenson describes Carlson's philanthropic style. According to Stevenson, Carlson's wife, Dorris, had some skill at extrasensory perception, and convinced Carlson to help support Stevenson's research into paranormal phenomena. Carlson not only made annual donations to the University of Virginia to fund Stevenson's work, but in 1964 he made a particularly large donation that helped fund one of the first endowed chairs at the university. Stevenson was the first incumbent of this chair.

Although Carlson insisted on anonymous donations, wrote Stevenson, he was unusual in that he closely followed the details of the research, maintaining contact with Stevenson. "He rarely made suggestions, but what he said always deserved attention," wrote Stevenson.

In the spring of 1968, while on vacation in the Bahamas, Carlson had his first heart attack. He was gravely ill, but hid this from his wife, embarking on a number of unexpected household improvements and concealing his doctor's visits. On September 19, Carlson died of a heart attack. Dorris arranged a small service in New York City; Xerox held a much larger service in the corporate auditorium in Rochester on September 26, 1968.

== Legacy ==
The New York Civil Liberties Union was among the beneficiaries of his bequests. The University of Virginia received $1 million, under strict instructions that the money was to be used only to fund parapsychology research. The Center for the Study of Democratic Institutions received a bequest of over $4.2 million from Carlson, in addition to the more than $4 million he had contributed while alive.

In 1981 Carlson was inducted into the National Inventors Hall of Fame.

United States Public Law 100-548, signed into law by Ronald Reagan, designated October 22, 1988, as "National Chester F. Carlson Recognition Day". He was honored by the United States Postal Service with a 21¢ Great Americans series postage stamp.

Carlson is memorialized by buildings at the two largest institutions of higher learning in Rochester, New York, Xerox's hometown. The Chester F. Carlson Center for Imaging Science, a department of the Rochester Institute of Technology, specializes in remote sensing, eye tracking, and xerography. The University of Rochester's Carlson Science and Engineering Library is the university's primary library for the science and engineering disciplines.

On October 25, 2019, New York City honored Carlson's legacy by officially co-naming 37th Street in Queens, New York — where his first makeshift lab was — after him.

The following awards are named in Carlson's honor:

- American Society for Engineering Education: The Chester F. Carlson Award is presented annually to an individual innovator in engineering education who, by motivation and ability to extend beyond the accepted tradition, has made a significant contribution to the profession.
- Royal Swedish Academy of Engineering Science, IVA: The Chester Carlson Award recognizes persons or institutions for significant research or development within the area of information science.
- Society for Imaging Science and Technology: The Chester F. Carlson Award recognizes outstanding technical work that advances the state of the art in electrophotographic printing.

== See also ==
- Copy art
- Photocopier
- Duplicating machines
- Thomas Edison
- David Gestetner
