= Print reading =

Print reading, in the manufacturing industry, is the most efficient way to convey information about systems and equipment from the drafting table that could not be conveyed by words alone. By using symbols and notes, a large amount of information that might require many pages of written description can be presented in a condensed form on one diagram.

Since there are many different types of print, using just one diagram with all the information available for that equipment on the same page would be cluttered and ultimately useless. For this reason, the different types of prints evolved. They make the information that the specific type of print is meant to convey clear and uncluttered.
