= Alexander Just =

German-Hungarian chemist (1874–1937)

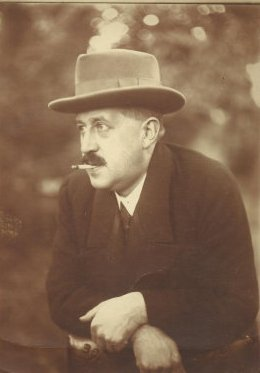
Alexander Just

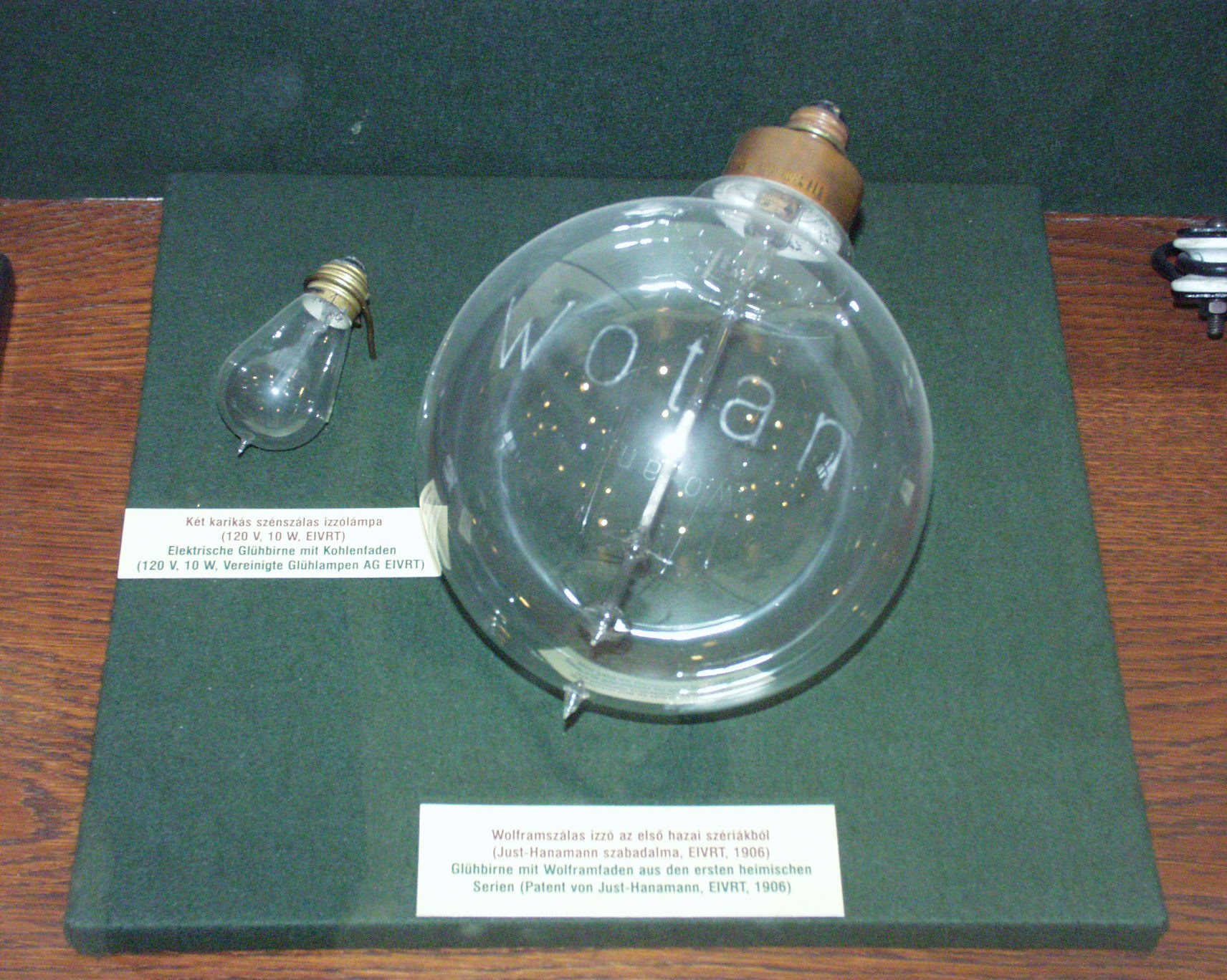
A Just–Hanaman light-bulb, Budapest, 1906

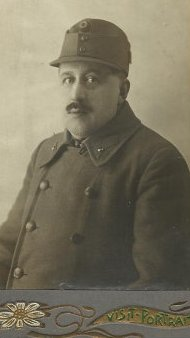
Alexander Just as a soldier during World War I

Alexander Friedrich Just (12 April 1874, in Bremen – 30 May 1937, in Budapest) was an Austro-Hungarian chemist and inventor. Later, in Hungary he used the name Just Sándor Frigyes. In 1904 with Austro-Hungarian Franjo Hanaman he was the first to develop and patent an incandescent light bulb with a tungsten filament, made by extruding a paste of tungsten powder and a carbonaceous binder to produce a fine thread, then removing the carbon by heating in an atmosphere of hydrogen and water vapors. Just and Hanaman received a Hungarian patent in 1904, and later US Patent 1,018,502. In 1905, Just and Hanaman patented a process for producing tungsten filaments by plating carbon filaments with tungsten, then removing the carbon by heating. These early tungsten lamps were more efficient than a carbon filament lamp, because they could operate at a high temperature, due to the high melting point of tungsten. The tungsten was, however, so brittle that these lamps were of limited practical use. It was supplanted by the drawn tungsten filament lamp, developed in 1910 by William David Coolidge.
