= Franjo Hanaman =

Croatian inventor, engineer and chemist

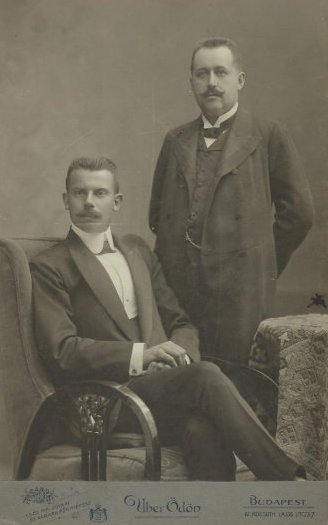
Franjo Hanaman (seated) and Alexander Just

Franjo Hanaman (June 30, 1878 – January 23, 1941) was a Croatian inventor, engineer, and chemist, who gained world recognition for inventing the world's first applied electric light-bulb with a metal filament (tungsten) with his assistant Alexander Just, independently of his contemporaries.

Franjo Hanaman was born in the village of Drenovci in Slavonia (at the time Kingdom of Croatia-Slavonia, Austria-Hungary) to a Croatian family as a second child of father Gjuro Hanaman and Emilija Mandušić.

Hanaman and Just were granted the Hungarian Patent #34541 on December 13, 1904 in Budapest. His invention of tungsten filament was also applied in improving early diodes and triodes.

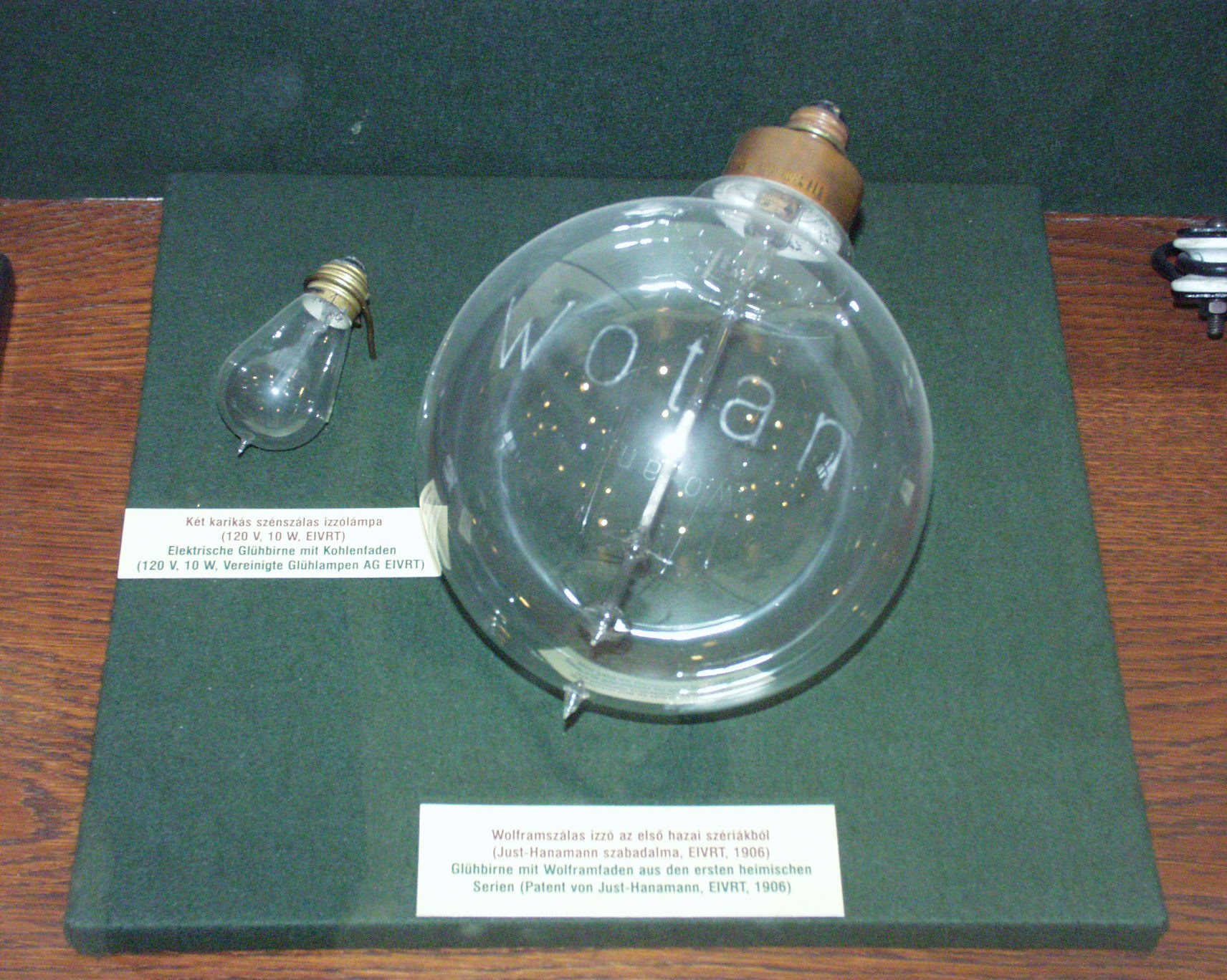
Right an Just–Hanaman light-bulb, Budapest, 1906.

He died in Zagreb (at the time Kingdom of Yugoslavia).
