= Dessauer =

Dessauer is a German surname meaning "from Dessau". Notable people with the surname include:

- Alois Dessauer (1763–1850), German banker, manufacturer
- Ferdinand Dessauer (also Dessoir, 1836–1892), German actor, son of Leopold
- Friedrich Dessauer (1881–1963), biophysician, philosopher, brother of Hans
- Gabriel Dessauer (born 1955), German cantor, concert organist and academic, son of Guido
- Guido Dessauer (1915–2012), German coloured paper manufacturer, art collector and academic, son of Hans
- Hans Dessauer (1869–1926), German coloured paper manufacturer and politician, son of Philipp
- Herbert C. Dessauer (1921–2013), American biochemist
- John H. Dessauer (1905–1993), German born American chemical engineer, son of Hans
- Josef Dessauer (1798–1876), Bohemian-German composer
- Julius Dessauer (1832–1883), Hungarian rabbi and writer
- Leopold Dessauer, (1810–1874), Polish-German actor, known during his stage career as "Ludwig Dessoir"
- Philipp Dessauer, (1837–1900), German industrialist, father of Hans
- Leopold I, Prince of Anhalt-Dessau (1676–1747), known by the nickname "the old Dessauer"

== See also ==
- Dessoir
