= Dessau (disambiguation) =

Dessau is a town in Germany, part of Dessau-Roßlau.

Dessau may also refer to:

== Places ==
- Dessau-Roßlau, a town in Germany
- Dessau, a neighbourhood of Arendsee in Germany
- Dessau, a hamlet near Burggen in Germany
- Neu Dessau, a neighbourhood in Milower Land in Germany
- Dessau, Germany
- Dessau, an unincorporated community in Travis County

== As a surname ==
- Bruce Dessau, British comedy critic and writer
- Dorothy Dessau (1900–1980), American social worker
- Hermann Dessau (1856–1931), German historian and epigrapher
- Linda Dessau (born 1953), Australian judge and Governor of Victoria
- Ory Dessau, Israeli art curator and critic
- Paul Dessau (1894–1979), German composer and conductor
- Paul Lucien Dessau (1909–1999), British war artist

=== The family of Anhalt-Dessau ===
- George III, Prince of Anhalt-Dessau
- Leopold Anhalt-Dessau (disambiguation)
- Leopold I, Prince of Anhalt-Dessau
- Leopold II of Anhalt-Dessau
- Moritz of Anhalt-Dessau

== Other uses ==
- SV Dessau 05
- Battle of Dessau Bridge
- Dessauer Ufer, a subcamp to the Neuengamme concentration camp
- Dessau, Canadian engineering firm
- Dessau (band), industrial rock band from Nashville formed in 1983
  - Dessau (Dessau album), 1995 album by Dessau
- Dessau (Codeine album), a 2022 archival album by Codeine

== See also ==
- Dessauer
- Dessoir
