= Moshe Rosenthalis =

Lithuanian-Israeli painter and art teacher (1922-2008)

Moshe Rosenthalis משה רוזנטליס
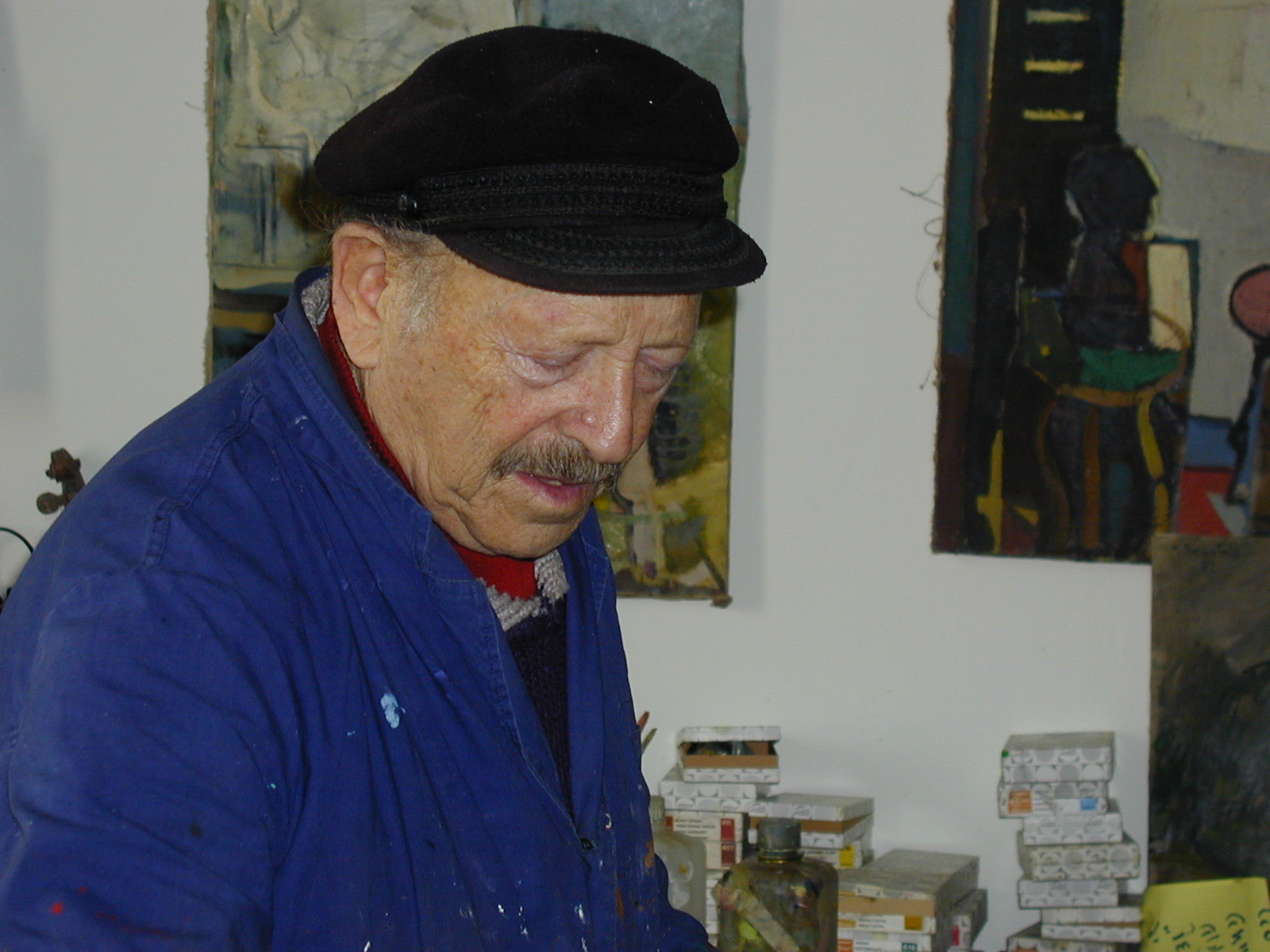
- Moshe Rosenthalis, 2003, artist's studio, Jaffa
- Born: November 18, 1922; Marijampolė, Lithuania
- Died: August 26, 2008 (aged 85); Tel Aviv, Israel
- Known for: Painting
- Movement: Israeli art

Moshe Rosenthalis (Hebrew: משה רוזנטליס; November 18, 1922 – August 26, 2008) was a Lithuanian-Israeli painter and an art teacher. As a young artist in Lithuania, then part of the Soviet Union, he adapted the dominant Socialist realist discipline. After his immigration to Israel in 1958, where he lived and created for 50 years until his death, he implemented various art methods, including Abstract, Fauvism, Figurative, Expressionism and diverse media and bases. He painted thousands of drawings, portraits, and engravings. His paintings were characterized by vivid colors and Joie de vivre. Many of his works drew inspiration from the Israeli landscapes, images, and peoples, especially of Jaffa Port and Safed.

== Biography ==
=== Early life and artistic career in Lithuania ===
Moshe Rosenthalis was born on 18 November 1922 in Marijampolė, Lithuania. His father was a grain merchant who had fallen from grace. At three, he strove to draw the street outside his home with a pencil. Rosenthalis received his first art lessons from the painter Aryeh (Levas) Margushilski, then a young art student and later a mentor to many painters in Tel Aviv.

In 1940, after completing his studies at the Hebrew High School in Marijampolė, he was accepted to the Kaunas Art School, and studied there for a year. In 1941, after the Germans invaded territories held by the Soviet Union, he fled to the Russian interior. Later, he was conscripted into the Lithuanian division of the Red Army and was wounded in battle. He was appointed as the official painter of his battalion. He painted portraits of military heroes and leaders and organized protagonist exhibitions to raise the soldiers' morale.

After his discharge from the army, Rosenthalis settled in Vilnius and enrolled in the Vilnius Academy of Arts, where he studied from 1945 to 1950. His teachers include Petras Kalpokas and Antanas Gudaitis; notable artists who studied there were Chaïm Soutine, Pinchus Kremegne and Jacques Lipchitz. He won two drawing prizes: one for poster design and the other for his diploma work. His final project, "Release of Political Prisoners from the Kaunas Jail in 1940", was on display at the Moscow Art Academy. Today it is on display at the Soviet Art Gallery of Grūtas Park. In 1950, at age 28, he was accepted to the Lithuanian Artists' Association. The official artistic style in the Soviet Union at that period was socialist realism, manifesting the natural and materialistic world without taking a stand. Rosenthalis had no option but to compromise and follow that school.

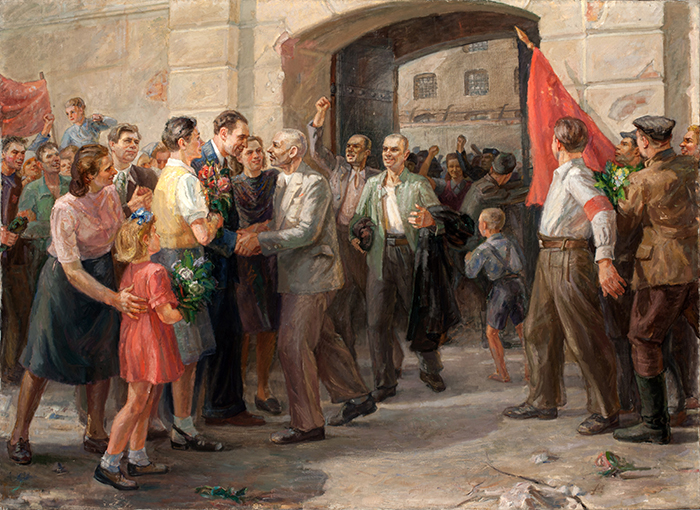
Release of Political Prisoners from the Kaunas Jail, 1950, oil on canvas, 160*220 (graduation project), National Museum of Lithuania

He participated in exhibitions throughout Lithuania, and in 1951 gained critical acclaim from Pravda art critic when he took part in a group exhibition held in Tretyakov Gallery, Moscow, among 300 canvasses, and has been awarded the Medal of Excellence by the Supreme Soviet. His works were acquired by museums and institutions throughout the USSR. Three of his works were purchased by the National Museum of Lithuania. An additional source of income for him was portrait paintings. He painted well-known figures, following the official social realism art. When he drew women, children, and close friends, he took more liberty, and the viewer can notice the future evocative colors and pronounced brush strokes.

=== Life and art in Israel ===
In 1957, because of his wife Sarah's birthplace in Polish Vilnius, the family received an exit permit and moved to Warsaw. Contrary to the artistic fetters in Lithuania, Poland was unabated by the Soviet establishment and had artistic freedom, influenced by the cultural trends prevalent in Paris, Western Europe, and the USA. He visited the Warsaw Museum and was overwhelmed by a Polish Avant-Garde exhibition. In 1958, at 36, after living in Poland for seven months, Rosenthalis immigrated to Israel and settled with his family in a shack on the outskirts of Tel Aviv. The Israeli art scene was turbulent by the controversy between two movements: first, artists who advocate loyalty to the Israeli native character, and the second, Ofakim Hadashim (New Horizons), at the helm of Joseph Zaritsky, supported the global abstract school, had the upper hand.

Rosenthalis was fluent in Hebrew, which he learned at the Jewish School in Marijampolė, and made his living teaching elementary drawing. He learned about modern art by visiting art galleries and studying books. During his first years in Israel, Rosenthalis continued to paint realistic portraits and topics corresponding to the diaspora along with figurative and evocative subjects. Among the figures he painted were the poets Avraham Shlonsky; and the artists Chaim Gliksberg, Shimshon Holzman, and Moshe Ziffer. During these years he participated in group and annual exhibitions in Independence Hall, Tel Aviv Museum, and the Israel Painters and Sculptors Association.

In the early 1960s, Rosenthalis painted his first abstract works but continued to paint landscapes, human figures, and still life, in a combination of abstract and realistic modes. Since 1963, for ten years, Rosenthalis explored the use of color on canvas and practiced the methods of Kazimir Malevich. He used color as direct as possible and abandoned the use of light, shade, and perspective. Many of his paintings comprise small angular areas in horizontal or vertical composition. Usually, the canvas set up in a few brush strokes, produced angular shapes related to the colors and their mutual alteration. Rosenthalis used a dozen delicate brush strokes. He inserted into many of his paintings bluish-gray color at the paintings' center. Over the years he concentrated on the structural basics of painting, while the topic became insignificant in his art. His paintings become prosaic, inspecting the correspondence between the color, the effects of light, and the apparent compositions.

In 1973, Rosenthalis stayed as an artist-in-residence at the Cité internationale des arts in Paris, where he experienced the French Modernism, which proved to be a pivotal point of his oeuvre. While in Paris, he studied the works of great modern artists such as Braque, Delaunay, Dufy, Kandinsky, Matisse, and Picasso. Manifestation of their influence can be seen in the increased translucency origin in his work thereafter. These paintings are performed partially, or entirely, in a diluted palette of colors so that their transparency reveals the background so that, also, as an integral function within the color format. After Paris, Rosenthalis used his brush friskily. He installed various geometric shapes, juxtaposed or superimposed. Shading is attained via the translucent effect, which allocates a role to the light and the watered down of paint. The tension between cold and warm colors, and between line and form, and he contrived the concept of polarity–not in a realistic way, but as an abstract expression of inner ideas and feelings. In 1990, Raffi Lavie wrote in Ha'ir: "A Rosenthalis' festival is on display... Picasso, Matisse, and Kandinsky would have liked what he had taken from each of them. The temperament, the fluidity of line, and the richness of color... This is a real painting, free of all pretensions of movements or of non-artistic theories.".

Since settling in Israel in 1958, for 17 years, Rosenthalis eschewed self-exposure. His Solo exhibition at the Petah Tikva Museum of Art in 1975 was his first major show. Dov Homsky wrote about the exhibition in Al HaMishmar: "The painting for Rosenthalis is a happening per se, a purpose per se ... His vision is humanistic. He fused his 'topics' into his 'self' His perception was impromptu and forthright, without intellectual inquiry. We can perceive the artists' love in each detail, the colors game, which is mischievous and sober simultaneously—made in a lyric affection of a very sensitive painter.". Adam Baruch wrote in Yedioth Ahronoth: "Even a viewer with the most pronounced contemporary inclinations will doff his hat to painting that is replete, well aware of the theatricality of the occupation, without becoming pathetic–and with the ability to cross or avoid such critical barriers as 'relevance' etc."

A 1983 retrospective exhibition at Herzliya Museum of Contemporary Art presented Rosenthalis' works from the years 1950–1983. Elyakim Yaron wrote: "An artist of perpetual change that cannot be summarized." In an introduction to a book about Rosenthalis, published by Keter Publishing House in 1984, Clara Malraux wrote: "The application of paint... is the most refined expression of the extent of the spectrum of colors in all its transitions... He planned and fitted together everything, leaving nothing to chance, despite the work's thrust for spontaneousness... This is total coordination between the man and the technique, between temperament and experience. Rosenthalis knows all the ways of French painting, but his uniqueness is in his own path." A series of his paintings are devoted to music and women with musical instruments.

Rosenthalis had been working in his atelier at Jaffa Port since 1964, his painting depicting the studio's exterior overlooking the Mediterranean Sea and interior, presented in his 2002 one-man exhibition at the Israeli National Maritime Museum in Haifa. In some of his early Jaffa's seashores from the late 1960s-early 1970s it's hard to discern any actual object. He muted the colors in his early compositions. He heightened the colors in his compositions starting in the 1970s. Since the 1980s, his color palette becomes even more luminous with linear motifs. He had a house in Safed, where he spent every summer, free from teaching and another undertaking, dedicated himself only to his art, painting the marketplace and its inhabitants.

In 2004, he presented a solo exhibition at The Open Museum, Migdal Tefen. Part of it displayed works he called 'etudes', created primarily outside his studio. These were small oil paintings, that served as a foundation for his sizeable and elaborate paintings, using a nimble freestyle. Initially, he created them in the mid-1950s in Lithuania, and continued in Israel, depicting the landscapes of Jaffa, Jerusalem, and Safed. On the show, they stood underneath the large compatible paintings.

=== Posthumous ===
Moshe Rosenthalis died at the age of 86 on August 26, 2008. He was survived by his wife Sara, who departed two years after him, and his son Avner, who worked as his art dealer and curator. His eldest son, Raphael, died in his forties. In 2009, his son Avner Rosenthalis, turn his studio into Rosenthalis House, an art gallery with a permanent collection of his fathers' works and a changing exhibition with various artists. In 2017, he closed Rosenthalis House.

In 2009, the exhibition "Moshe Rosenthalis The Freedom of Color" was on display at the Town Hall, Vilnius and later moved to the M. K. Čiurlionis National Art Museum. The exhibition encompassed artworks he produced during the years 1945 - 2007. He worked with diverse bases: acrylic and oil on canvas, watercolors, oil pastels, gouache, oil paintings using cardboard and plywood, collages and drawings. He experienced diverse art schools including Abstract, Fauvism, expressionism, and Realism. In a foreword to a book dedicated to Rosenthalis, published by Masada Publishing House in 1990, Adam Baruch wrote: "Rosenthalis is rooted in culture, not in Israeli culture, in its politics and poetics. He is here and not here. Faithful to himself, he lives among his canvases, within the history of modern art rather than within the history of Israeli art."

Four large-scale artwork delineates selected chapters from the annals of the Jewish People, commissioned by businessman Shaul Eisenberg, installed on the walls of the boardroom at Asia House in Tel Aviv in 1980. Rosenthalis paint them in a realistic-symbolic-figurative style, with a disregard for the classic perspective-color rules. In 1983 he created parallel four paintings, an abstract interpretation of the previous works, unwinding the literary narrative. In 2013, the exhibition "The Great Sight" was presented at the ANU - Museum of the Jewish People. The exhibition is composed of eight works together with dozens of small-scale drawings, sketches, and diagrams used as preparatory work for the four realistic paintings.

== Gallery ==
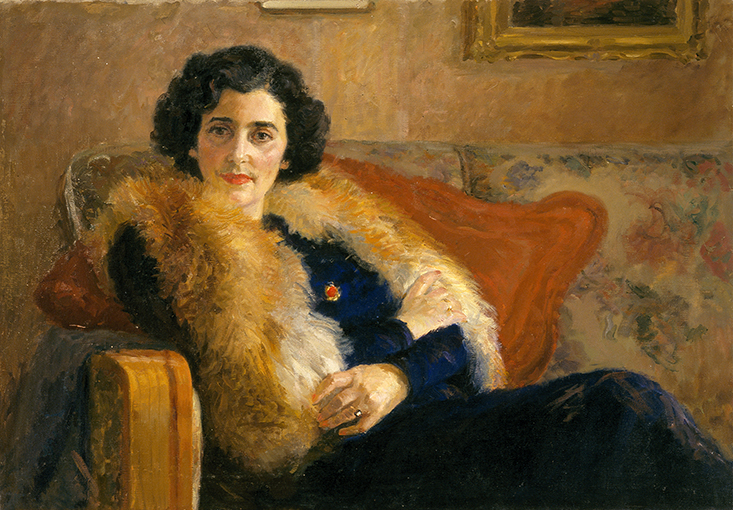
Portrait of Zila Ziburkeine, 1952, oil on canvas, 70*100, M. K. Čiurlionis National Art Museum

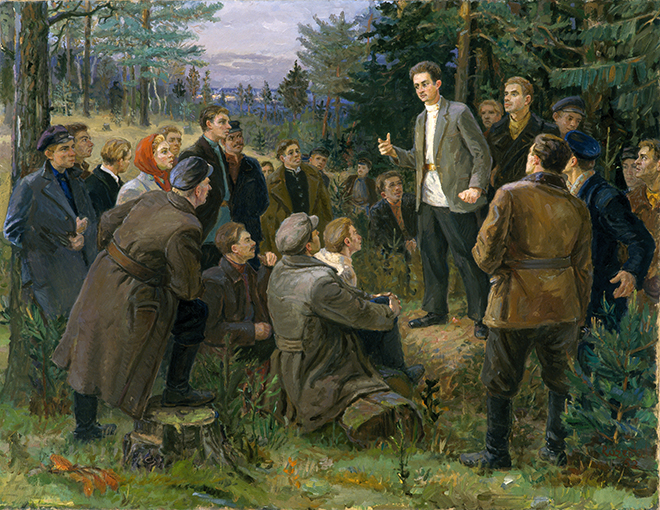
Felix Edmundovich Dzerzhinsky in a Clandestine Meeting, in a Forest near Vilnius, 1897, 1953, oil on canvas, 78*102, Lithuanian National Museum of Art

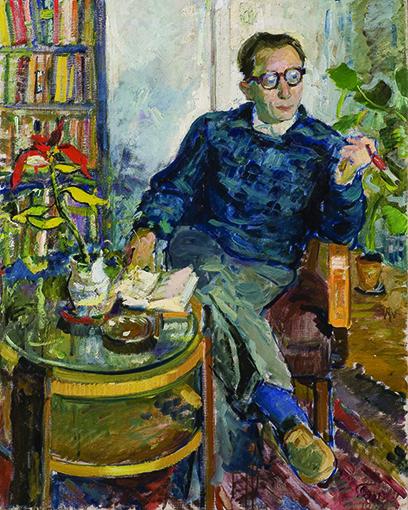
Portrait of poet Dr. David Sfard, 1958, 87*65

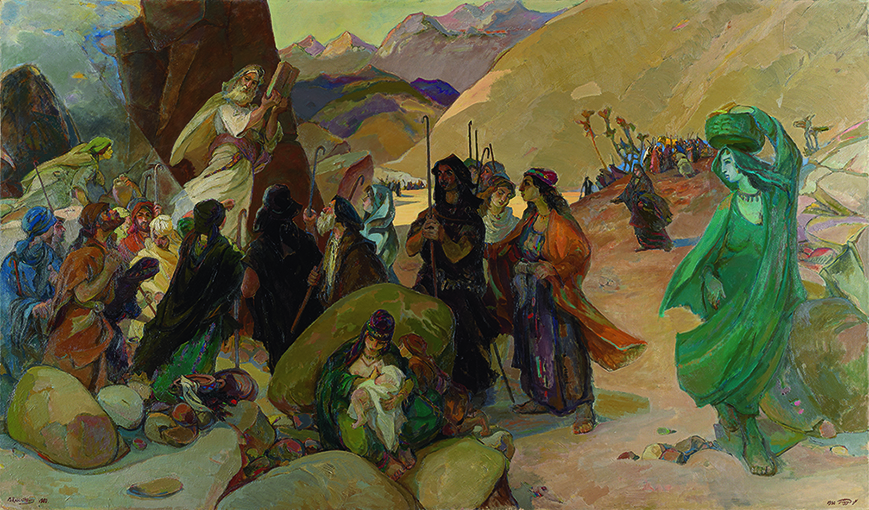
The Exodus from Egypt, 1978–80, oil on canvas, 158*270

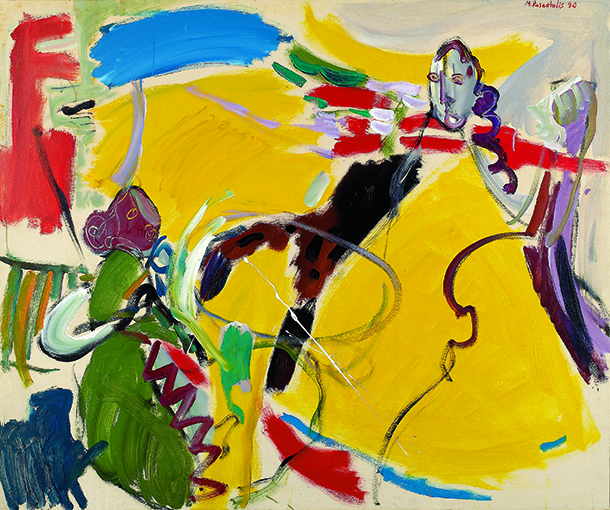
Two Women, 1990, oil on canvas, 127*152.5

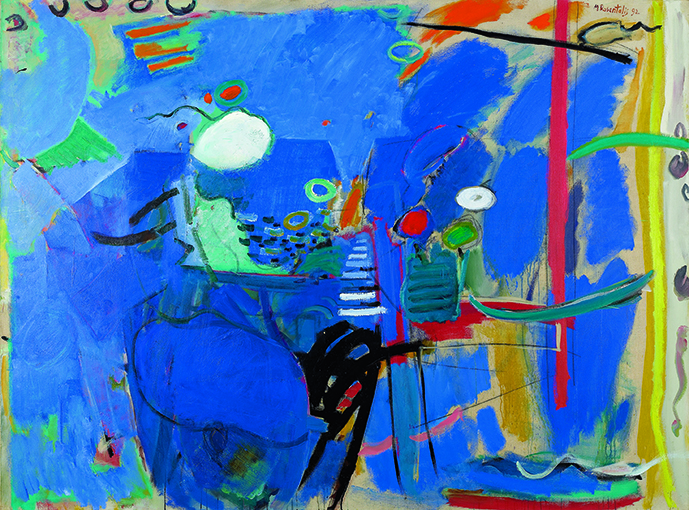
Pianist facing the Sea, 1992, oil on canvas, 145*195

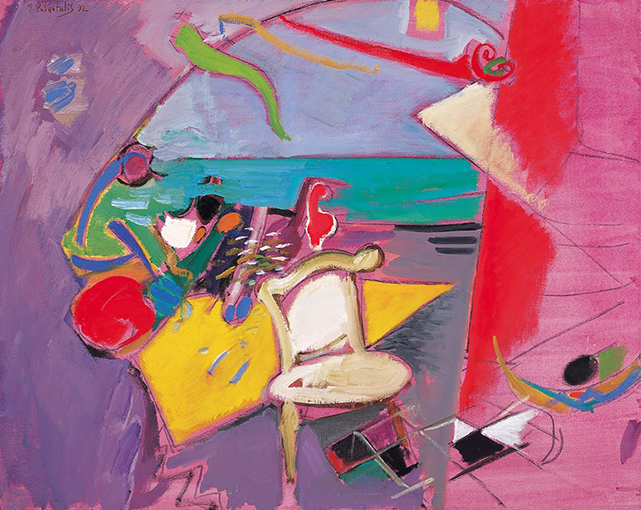
Studio facing the Sea with a Yellow Splash, 1992, oil on canvas, 81*101.6

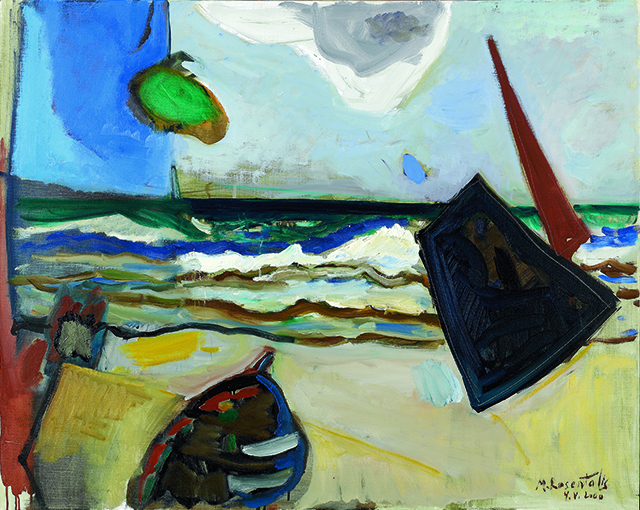
Boats in Jaffa Harbor, 2000, oil on canvas, 81*101.6

== Solo exhibitions ==
- 1973 - Oil and Watercolors, Writers' Club, Paris.
- 1973 - Cité internationale des arts, Paris.
- 1975 – "Moshe Rosenthalis", Petah Tikva Museum of Art, Petah Tikva.
- 1976 - Zuri Gallery, Ramat Hasharon.
- 1976 - Dyokan Gallery, Tel Aviv.
- 1977, 1978 - Jaffa Studio, Jaffa.
- 1979 - Tiroche Gallery, Jaffa.
- 1980 - Van Loo Gallery, Brussels.
- 1981 - Broekhoven Fine Art Gallery, Amsterdam.
- 1981 - Jaffa Studio, Jaffa.
- 1982 - Denia Gallery, Haifa.
- 1982 - Drawings and Etchings, A.R. Gallery, Tel Aviv.
- 1983 - Acrylics on Cardboard, Meir Gallery, Ra'anana.
- 1983 – "Moshe Rosenthalis: Retrospective", Herzliya Museum of Contemporary Art.
- 1983 - "New Paintings from Safed, Summer 83", A.R. Gallery Tel Aviv.
- 1984 - Jaffa Studio, Jaffa.
- 1984 - Alon Gallery, Santa Monica, California.
- 1985 - Galerie im Rathaus, Templehof, West Berlin.
- 1990 - "Small Formats", Tiroche Gallery, Tel Aviv.
- 1991 - Rienzo Gallery, New York.
- 1991 - Rigs Gallery, La Jolla, California.
- 1991 - "Big Formats & Sculptures", Park Gallery, Tel Aviv.
- 1991 - Alon Gallery, Brookline, Massachusetts.
- 1992 - Z Gallery, Soho, New York.
- 1992, 1994, 1996, 1998, 1999, 2001, 2003 - Miller Gallery, Cincinnati, Ohio.
- 1993 - Bar-David Museum of Art and Judaica, Bar'am.
- 1993, 1994, 1996, 1998, 1999, 2001 - Jeane Richards Gallery, Englewood, New Jersey.
- 1995 - Asia Art Center, Taipei, Taiwan.
- 1997 - Lois Richards Gallery, Greenwich, Connecticut.
- 1997 - Buschlen Mowatt Gallery, Vancouver.
- 2002 – "Moshe Rosenthalis: Studio facing the Sea", Israeli National Maritime Museum, Haifa.
- 2004 - "Moshe Rosenthalis: The Joy of Color", The Open Museum, Migdal Tefen.
- 2004 - "Moshe Rosenthalis: The Joy of Color", Omer Open Museum, Omer.
- 2009 – "Moshe Rosenthalis: The Color of Freedom" was presented at the Town Hall, Vilnius.
- 2009 – "Moshe Rosenthalis: The Color of Freedom", M. K. Čiurlionis National Art Museum.
- 2009 - "Rosenthalis Reworked, paintings 1959-2008", Rosenthalis House.
- 2009 - Zygman Voss Gallery, Chicago, Illinois.
- 2009 - "From Within the Waves", Warehouse No.2 at the Old Port of Jaffa.
- 2009 – "The 1000 Faces of Rosenthalis", The Artists House Tel Aviv.
- 2013 – "This Great Sight: Moshe Rosenthalis: History of the Jewish People", ANU - Museum of the Jewish People, Tel Aviv.

== Selected group exhibitions ==
- 1951 – Lithuanians Artists, Tretyakov Gallery, Moscow
- 1953 – Lithuanians Artists, Russian Academy of Sciences, Moscow.
- 1954 – Baltic artists, State Museum, Riga, Latvia.
- 1955 – "The Sea", State Museum, Moscow.
- 1950-1957 – Biannual Lithuanians Artists Exhibitions, National Museum of Lithuania.
- 1959 – "General Exhibition, On the Occasion of the 50th Anniversary of the City of Tel-Aviv", Tel Aviv Museum of Art
- 1963 – "General Exhibition of Art in Israel 1963", Tel Aviv Museum of Art
- 1965 – "Central Exhibition, Art in Israel 1965", Tel Aviv Museum of Art
- 1967 – "Artists in Israel for the Defense", Tel Aviv Museum of Art
- 1967 – "General Exhibition, Art in Israel 1967", Tel Aviv Museum of Art
- 1975 – Petah Tikva Museum of Art
- 1977 – "One Hundred Years - One Hundred Plus Artists", Petah Tikva Museum of Art
- 1978 – Petah Tikva Museum of Art
- 1982 – Petah Tikva Museum of Art
- 1983 – Petah Tikva Museum of Art
- 1996 – "Artists Messengers of Peace", Jerusalem Artists House
- 2004 - Bar-David Museum of Art and Judaica, Bar'am
- 2004 – "Still Landscape - New – Old", Haifa Museum of Art
- 2013 – "Man and Landscape", Omer Open Museum, Omer
- 2013 – "School of Paris in the Artists' Quarter in Safed in the 1950s-1960s", Hecht Museum, Haifa
- 2016 – "Men and Women from the Museum Collection", Bar-David Museum of Art and Judaica, Bar'am

== Collections ==
- National Museum, Moscow
- Tretyakov Gallery, Moscow
- Lithuanian National Museum of Art, Vilnius, Lithuania
- National Museum of Lithuania, Vilnius
- Soviet Art Gallery of Grūtas Park, Lithuania
- State Museum, Riga, Latvia
- M. K. Čiurlionis National Art Museum, Kaunas, Lithuania
- Tel Aviv Museum of Art
- Haifa Museum of Art
- Herzliya Museum of Contemporary Art
- Petah Tikva Museum of Art
- Mishkan Museum of Art, Ein Harod (Meuhad)
- Israel Phoenix Insurance Company
- The Knesset, Jerusalem
- President's House, Jerusalem
- Bar-David Museum, Kibbutz Bar'am
- Israel Discount Bank
- Bank Leumi
- Bank Hapoalim

== Awards And prizes ==
- 1948 First Prize for Drawing, Vilnius Academy of Arts, Vilnius, USSR
- 1949 First Prize for Drawing, Vilnius Academy of Arts, Vilnius, USSR
- 1950 Acquisition Prize, Lithuanian Soviet Socialist Republic
- 1951 Poster Design Award, Ministry of Education, Lithuanian Soviet Socialist Republic
- 1954 Award for Achievement in the Visual Arts, Lithuanian Soviet Socialist Republic
- 1966 Acquisition Prize, General Organization of Workers in Israel
- 1973 Artist-in-residence, Cité internationale des arts, Paris, France
- 1997 Israel Polack Prize for Literature and Culture, Shalom Alechem House

== Movie ==
In 2006, a documentary film about Rosenthalis, "Self-Portrait," directed by Eli Cohen, aired on Channel 8, Hot.

== Books and catalogues ==
- 1975 Moshe Rosenthalis, Petah Tikva Museum of Art, Petach Tikva (catalog).
- 1979 Moshe Rosenthalis, Tiroche Gallery, Jaffa (catalog).
- 1982 David Giladi, Moshe Rosenthalis, Drawings and Etchings, A.R. Gallery, Tel Aviv (catalog).
- 1983 Moshe Rosenthalis, A Retrospective, 1950–1983, Herzlia Museum of Art, Herzlia (catalog).
- 1983 Moshe Rosenthalis, New Paintings from Safed, Summer '83, A.R. Gallery, Tel Aviv (catalog).
- 1984 David Giladi, Moshe Rosenthalis, Artist and His Work (introduction by Clara Malraux), Keter Publishing, Jerusalem.
- 1985 Elyakim Yaron, Moshe Rosenthalis, A Journey to the Mysteries of Color, A.R. Gallery, Tel Aviv.
- 1985 Moshe Rosenthalis, Galerie im Rathaus, Tempelhof, West Berlin (catalog).
- 1990 Moshe Rosenthalis, Paintings 1983-1990 (introduction by Adam Baruch- Hebrew. Melissa Feldman-English), Massada Publishing House, Givatayim, Israel.
- 1991 Moshe Rosenthalis, Art Chicago, Chicago (catalog).
- 1991 Moshe Rosenthalis, New Paintings, Summer 1991, Riggs Gallery, La Jolla, California (catalog)
- 1993 Moshe Rosenthalis, Sculptures and Small Oils, Medici Gallery, Carmel, California (catalog).
- 1995 Moshe Rosenthalis, Asia Art Center, Taipei, Taiwan (catalog).
- 2002 Moshe Rosenthalis, Studio Facing the Sea, Haifa Museums, The National Maritime Museum, Haifa (catalog).
- 2004 The Joy of Color, The Open Museums, Industrial Parks Tefen and Omer (catalog).
- 2009 The Color of Freedom, Vilnius City Hall and National Museum of Art in Kaunas, Lithuania (catalog).
- 2009 Homage A Rosenthalis: "From Within the Waves" – Ory Dessau." On the Sensual in Art" - Gideon Ofrat. "The 1000 Faces of Rosenthalis" – Daniella Talmor, "Colorist by Nature" – Hana Kofler.
- "Rosenthalis' Re-Work, paintings 1959-2008" – Avner Rosenthalis. Halfi Publishing House, Holon, Israel.
