= Dessoir =

Dessoir is a surname. Notable people with the surname include:

- Ferdinand Dessoir (1836–1892), German actor
- Ludwig Dessoir (1810–1874), German actor
- Max Dessoir (1867–1947), German philosopher and theorist of aesthetics
- Susanne Dessoir (1859–1953), German operatic singer

== See also ==
- Dessau (disambiguation)
- Dessauer
