= Újpest Synagogue =

Synagogue in Budapest, Hungary

- Hungarian: Újpesti zsinagóga
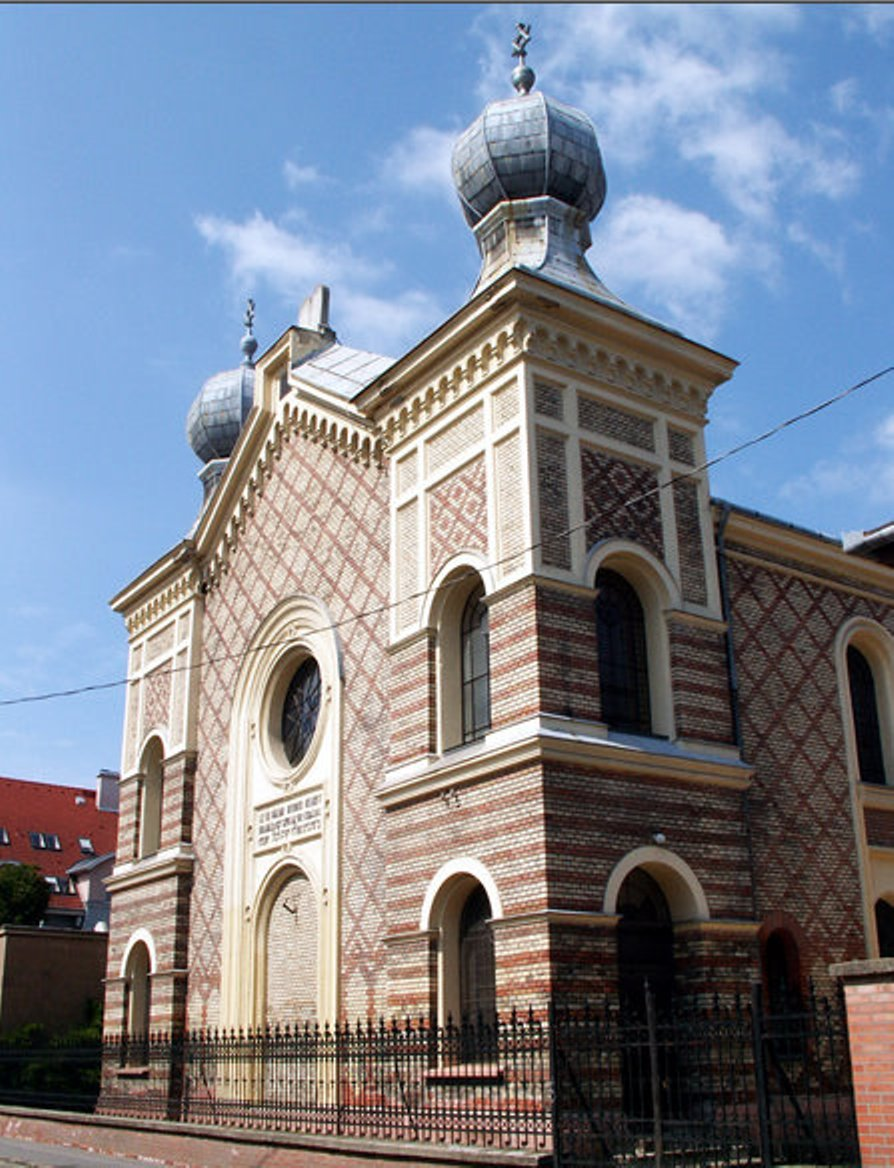
- The synagogue in 2010

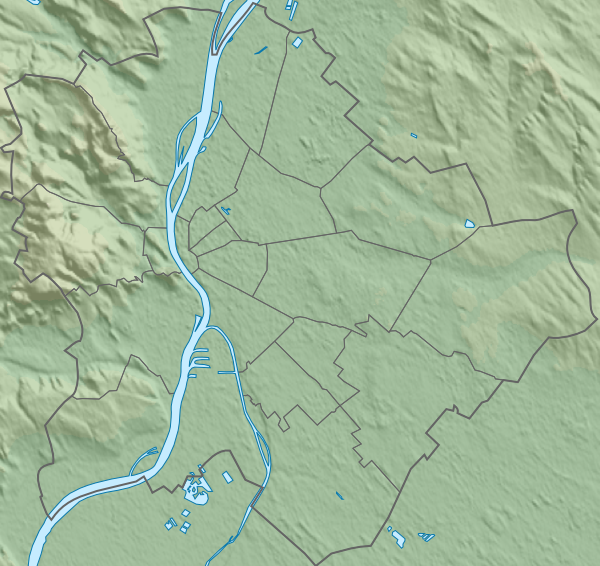
- Location of the synagogue in Budapest

Religion
- Affiliation: Neolog Judaism
- Rite: Nusach Ashkenaz
- Ecclesiastical or organisational status: Synagogue
- Status: Active

Location
- Location: 8 Berzeviczy Gergely Street, Újpest, Budapest
- Country: Hungary
- Coordinates: 47°33′44″N 19°04′58″E

Architecture
- Architects: Ármin Hegedűs; Henrik Böhm
- Type: Synagogue architecture
- Style: Romanesque Revival; Moorish Revival
- Founder: Lowy family
- Completed: 1866

Specifications
- Capacity: 1,000 seats
- Dome: Two (maybe more)
- Materials: Brick

The Újpest Synagogue (Hungarian: Újpesti zsinagóga) is a Neolog Jewish congregation and synagogue, located at 8 Berzeviczy Gergely Street, in Újpest, Budapest, Hungary.

== History ==
Completed in 1866, designed in the Romanesque Revival and Moorish Revival styles, the synagogue holds 1,000 seats. Rabbi Sander Rosenberg from Arad officiated at the opening ceremony. Its establishment was a "great holiday" for the Jews and Christians of Újpest. It lies in 8 Gergely Berzeviczy Street about five minutes from Újpest-Városkapu metro station.

The synagogue was founded by the Lowy family.

The Orthodox community split off and created their own synagogue.

During World War II, the synagogue was looted and partially destroyed by the Nazis. After the war the synagogue was rebuilt and a Holocaust memorial was added next to the synagogue. The memorial, which was unveiled by Hungarian President Zoltán Tildy, is a wall with names of the 17,000 Jewish Ujpest residents that were victims of the Holocaust.

== See also ==
- History of the Jews in Hungary
- List of synagogues in Hungary
