= Philipp Dessauer =

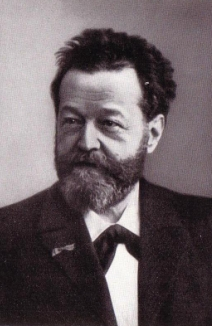
Philipp Dessauer

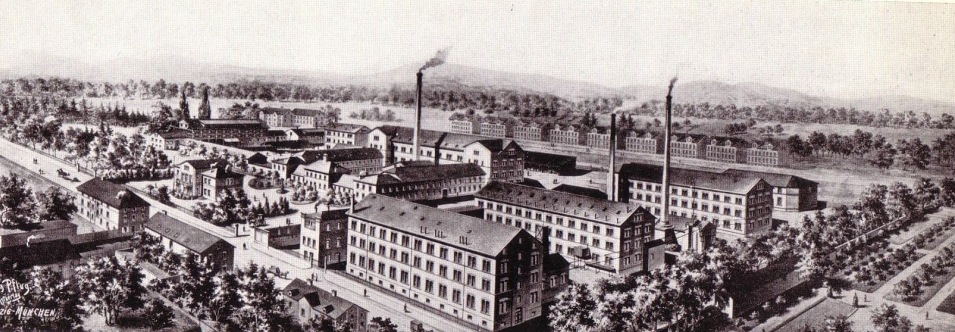
View of the "Aktiengesellschaft für Buntpapier und Leimfabrikation Aschaffenburg", c. 1884

Philipp Dessauer (20 June 1837 – 19 August 1900) was a "Kgl. Bayer. Kommerzienrat" (Royal Bavarian Commerce Advisor) and founder of the paper factory Weißpapier- und Cellulosefabrik Aschaffenburg in Aschaffenburg.

== Career ==
Philipp Dessauer was born in Aschaffenburg, the son of Franz Johann Dessauer and Alberta (Berta) Katharina Theresia Molitor.

After completing Gymnasium, Dessauer joined in 1852 his father's coloured paper factory, which he headed from 1866 as director. The war of 1870/71 left a shortage of white paper. Therefore, he founded in 1872 a factory for white paper.

He died in Aschaffenburg.

== Awards and honors ==
- Board of Aschaffenburg community representative
- Chairman of the District Board of Trade, factories and commercial
- Member of the Bavarian Railway Council
- Committee member of the Wittelsbach family foundation
- Co-founder and Chairman of the Association of German pulp factory
- Knight of the Orden vom Hl. Michael (Order of St Michael) 4th Class
- Knight of the Königl. Preußischer Kronenorden (Royal Prussian Crown Order) 4th Class
- Honorary citizen of Damm (now part of Aschaffenburg)

On the occasion of his 175th birthday, a celebration took place in the Ridingersaal of the Aschaffenburg castle.

== Descendants ==
A son, Hans Dessauer, succeeded him in 1900 in the management of the company. The youngest son was Friedrich Dessauer. Grandchildren were John H. Dessauer, who went to the United States in 1936, and his brother, the producer, art collector and professor Guido Dessauer. A granddaughter, Marielies Schleicher, was a member of the Bavarian parliament from 1962 to 1974. A great-granddaughter, Ursula Schleicher, was a member of the parliament of the European Union.
