= Yosef Goldman =

American scholar (1942–2015)

Yosef Goldman (1942 – August 4, 2015) was a scholar of American Jewish history and the co-author of the two-volume reference work, Hebrew Printing in America 1735-1926: A History and Annotated Bibliography (2006). This work is usually cited by auctioneers and rare-book dealers. His collection of early American Judaica and Hebraica is said to be one of the most comprehensive in the world.

== Biography ==
Goldman was born in 1942 in Újpest (also known as Newpest), a District of Budapest, Hungary, into a Hasidic family. His father, Rabbi Lipa Goldman, was a Chief Rabbi and Av Beis Din of an Orthodox Jewish community in Újpest. In 1950, his family emigrated to the United States and lived on the Lower East Side of Manhattan. Goldman studied at Beth Medrash Elyon of Monsey, New York, at the time an elite Rabbinical seminary.

By profession, Goldman was a dealer of rare Jewish/Hebrew books and manuscripts and was known as a leading figure in this field.

On August 4, 2015, he died from complications of melanoma.

In 2018, a large part of his book collection and stock was acquired by Mizrahi Bookstore.

== "Hebrew 52" lawsuit ==
In May 2000, Goldman bid on and purchased a 13th-century Biblical manuscript for $358,000 from the auction house, Christie's of New York. In May 2006, Bibliothèque Nationale de France (National Library of France) filed suit against Goldman, claiming ownership of the manuscript and demanding its return. This lawsuit was filed after a former chief curator of the library's Hebrew collection, Michel Garel, was convicted in March 2006 of stealing ‘Hebrew 52’, a Biblical manuscript known among experts. After pleading innocent, Garel was ultimately convicted, fined $500,000, and given a two-year suspended sentence. The lawsuit against Goldman alleged that the manuscript Goldman purchased was the one known as ‘Hebrew 52’. In July 2006, Goldman sued Christie's in Brooklyn Supreme Court, saying the auction house knew before consignment that the manuscript was stolen, that it should never have accepted consignment of it for auction, and that he should be refunded $358,000 in return for the manuscript.

In January 2007, The New York Times reported that a settlement had been reached. After complex negotiations between French officials, Christie’s and Goldman, the manuscript was returned to the library, and Goldman received a refund. Library officials said that Goldman purchased the manuscript in good faith and had resold it before its theft was discovered. France reportedly agreed to cover some of Goldman’s legal expenses.

In January 2007, Michel Garel, the former chief curator, was sentenced to 15 months in jail. He was convicted on appeal and immediately taken into custody. He was also handed an additional 15-month suspended sentence and fined €75,000 (US$100,000) for "aggravated theft".

== References and sources ==
- Levine, Yitzchak. "Hooked On American Jewish History", The Jewish Press, December 6, 2006. Accessed 2008-01-02.
- "Court battle for stolen artefact; A New York art dealer is locked in a legal battle with France and auction house Christie's over a 13th Century Jewish manuscript BBC, August 6, 2006. Accessed 2008-01-02.
- Riding, Alan (January 10, 2007). "French National Library Recovers Stolen Manuscript". The New York Times.
- Catálogo biblioteca del Instituto Cervantes de Nueva York. Accessed 2008-01-02.
- Sarna, Jonathan D. "Hebrew Printing in America 1735-1926: A History and Annotated Bibliography (review)", American Jewish History - Volume 91, Number 4, December 2003, pp. 509–512. Accessed 2008-01-02.
- National Library of Canada, accessed 2008-01-02.
- "Wellsprings of Torah", Mishpacha Magazine, p. 54-58, November 28, 2007.

Specific
