= Ursula Schleicher =

German politician and harpist (1933–2026)

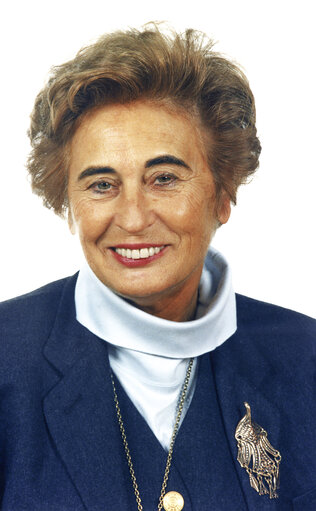

Member of the European Parliament
- In office 17 July 1979 – 19 July 2004
- Parliamentary group: European People's Party Group
- Constituency: West Germany (1979–1990); Germany (1990–2004)

Member of the Bundestag
- In office 1972–1980

Personal details
- Born: 15 May 1933 Aschaffenburg, Gau Main Franconia, Germany
- Died: 18 June 2026 (aged 93)
- Party: Christian Social Union in Bavaria
- Occupation: Harpist

Ursula Schleicher (15 May 1933 – 18 June 2026) was a German Christian Social Union in Bavaria politician and harpist who served two terms in the Bundestag from 1972 to 1980 and five terms in the European Parliament between 1979 and 2004. She served as state chair of the Paneuropean Union in Bavaria between 1988 and 1994 before becoming its deputy federal chair in 1995 and was a Vice-President of the European Parliament from 1994 to 1999. Schleicher was appointed Commander of the Order of Merit of the Italian Republic, the Bavarian Order of Merit and the Grand Cross of Merit of the Order of Merit of the Federal Republic of Germany in 2001.

== Early life ==
Schleicher was born in Aschaffenburg, Gau Main Franconia, Germany, on 15 May 1933. She is one of six children to the dermatologist Adolf Schleicher, and his wife Marielies Schleicher, a Member of the Landtag of Bavaria for the Christian Social Union in Bavaria (CSU) from 1962 to 1974. Schleicher is the great-granddaughter of the Aschaffenburg industrialist Philipp Dessauer. She enrolled at secondary school in her hometown and graduated in 1952 when she passed her Abitur. Schleicher worked as an au pair in Verona, Italy, where she learnt Italian and learnt to play the piano. From 1953 to 1957, she studied cultural sciences and medicine at Goethe University Frankfurt in Frankfurt and then majored in the harp during her music degree at a music school in Munich between 1957 and 1961.

== Career ==
Schleicher was employed as a harp and piano teacher for the Seminários Livres de Música at the Federal University of Bahia in Bahia, Brazil from 1961 to 1963 and was the university orchestra's first harpist. She went on to work at an Italian news agency in Munich between 1964 and 1965. In 1965, Schleicher became a member of the CSU after she was persuaded to enter politics by Anton Jaumann, the Bavarian Minister for Economy and Transport. She thus became the CSU's women's affairs officer that same year at party headquarters in Munich. The job entailed her travelling across Germany in towns with no women on their ward councils and was instrumental in the building of the Women's Union. In 1972, Schleicher was elected to the Bundestag via the CSU's party list and took leave from her job as its women's affairs officer three years later. She was the only female on the CSU's parliamentary group for the first four years and was chair of the family committee. Schleicher was a secretary of the Presidium of the Bundestag from 1972 to 1979, chair of the women's union in Lower Fraconia between 1975 and 1995 and deputy federal chair of the Catholic Worker Movement from 1975 to 1983.

At the 1979 European Parliament election in West Germany, she was elected as a Member of the European Parliament (MEP), serving a five-year term in the European Parliament on behalf of the European People's Party (EPP) and the European Democrats for the Germany constituency. Schleicher was a member of the Committee on the Environment, Public Health and Consumer Protection and the Delegation for relations with the Committee of EFTA Parliamentarians. She left the Bundestag in 1980, and became vice-president of European Movement Germany in the same year. Schleicher was reelected to the European Parliament at the 1984 European Parliament election in West Germany. She became vice-chair of the Committee on the Environment, Public Health and Consumer Protection and a substitute of each of the Committee on Budgets, the Committee on Women's Rights and the Committee on Youth, Culture, Education, Information and Sport.

She gained her third term in the European Parliament at the 1989 European Parliament election in West Germany. She was made a member of the Delegation for relations with the Maghreb countries and the Delegation for relations with Czechoslovakia (later the Delegation for relations with the Czech Republic and the Slovak Republic). Schleicher became a substitute of the Committee on Social Affairs, Employment and the Working Environment, the Delegation for relations with Hungary, the Delegation for relations with the Maghreb countries and the Arab Maghreb Union and the Delegation to the EU-Hungary Joint Parliamentary Committee. In 1994, she stood down as vice-chair of the Committee on the Environment, Public Health and Consumer Protection. That same year, she was reelected to a fourth term in the European Parliament at the 1994 European Parliament election in Germany. Schleicher was made a Vice-President of the European Parliament and of the Parliament Bureau for the duration of her term. She became a member of the Delegation for relations with South Africa and was a substitute of the Committee on Agriculture and Rural Development, the Committee on Institutional Affairs and Committee on the Rules of Procedure, the Verification of Credentials and Immunities.

At the 1999 European Parliament election in Germany, Schleicher was re-elected to serve a fifth term in the European Parliament. She was chair of both the Delegations to the parliamentary cooperation committees for relations with Armenia, Azerbaijan and Georgia and the Delegation to the EU-Armenia, EU-Azerbaijan and EU-Georgia Parliamentary Cooperation Committees and vice-chair of the Committee on Constitutional Affairs. Schleicher was a member of the Conference of Delegation Chairs and a substitute for the Committee on the Environment, Public Health and Consumer Policy. She retired as an MEP on 19 July 2004. Schleicher was president of the European Union of Women from 1983 to 1987 and was a member of the EPP's executive committee between 1984 and 2004. She was deputy chair of the CSU-BV Unterfranken from 1985 to 2005 and was state chair of the Paneuropean Union in Bavaria between 1988 and 1994 before becoming its deputy federal chair in 1995. Between 1997 and 2004, Schleicher was president of the Belgian-Bavarian Society.

== Personal life and death ==
Schleicher was Roman Catholic and never married. Besides German, Schleicher was fluent in English, French, Italian and Portuguese. She died on 18 June 2026, at the age of 93.

== Awards ==
In 1979, she was conferred with the Commander of the Order of Merit of the Italian Republic and the Bavarian Order of Merit in 1983. Schleicher was appointed Officer's Cross of the Federal Republic of Germany in 1990. That same year, she received the Decoration of Honor of the German Medical Association and the Gold Badge of Honor of the VdK Bavaria. Schleicher was honoured with the Bayerische Verfassungsmedaille, and the Medal for special services to Bavaria in a united Europe in 1996. In 1998, she earned the Robert Schuman Medal of the EPP Group and the Pro-Retina Award. Schleicher was upgraded to the Grand Cross of Merit of the Order of Merit of the Federal Republic of Germany and received the Bavarian Environment Medal in 2001.
