= Újpest Water Tower =

Coordinates: 47°33′45″N 19°06′23″E

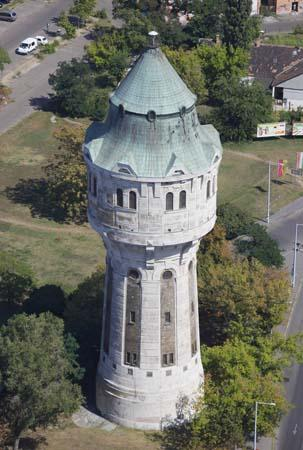
- Interactive map of the Újpest Water Tower area

General information
- Type: Water tower
- Architectural style: Art Nouveau
- Location: Újpest, Budapest, Hungary
- Construction started: 1911
- Completed: 1912
- Client: Magyar Vízmű Részvénytársaság

Height
- Height: 27 m (89 ft)

Design and construction
- Architects: Győző Mihailich, Ödön Dümmerling
- Architecture firm: Compagnie Générále des Conduites d' Eau Liége Belgique

The Újpest Water Tower (Hungarian: Újpesti víztorony) is one of many water towers in Budapest.

== History ==
The Újpest Water Tower played an important role in World War II. Explosives were stored within the tower, possibly reserved for its later destruction. In December 1944, Hungarian partisans ambushed the Arrow Cross guards and seized the ammunition, this preventing the tower from being destroyed. If it had been destroyed, the entire area would have been left without water.
