= Monthly Abstract Bulletin =

Monthly Abstract Bulletin is a monthly scientific journal documenting recent developments in photographing and printing, published in Rochester, New York from 1915 to 1961. It is authored by Kodak Research Laboratories, associated with the Anso company, and is published by the Eastman Kodak Company. It was John H. Dessauer, a former employee of Anco incidentally, who spotted an article about electrostatic photography, later known as xerography in the Monthly Abstract Bulletin in April 1945 and recognized its potential for copying, who together with Chester Carlson and businessman Joseph C. Wilson were behind the success of the Xerox Corporation.
