= Sándor Rosenberg =

Alexander [Sándor] Rosenberg (1844 – 11 August 1909) was a Hungarian Neolog rabbi.

Rosenberg was born in Makó; after studying at Vienna and Leipzig, and was trained in the Jewish Theological Seminary of Breslau, where he was made Doctor of Philosophy. He officiated at the opening ceremony of the Ujpest Synagogue in 1866. In 1868 he was elected preacher in Nagyvárad. There, the progressive elements in the community seceded from the conservative majority in 1861, seeking to administer synagogue reforms. While the authorities forced reunification in 1863, they allowed the former to maintain a house of worship. In 1870, in the aftermath of the Schism in Hungarian Jewry, the dispute was institutionalized and they formed an independent Neolog congregation. Rosenberg was its first rabbi. In 1876 he was appointed Neolog rabbi of Kaposvár, and in 1886 he took the same office in Arad. In the 1890s, he was a prominent figure in the struggle for obtaining Judaism the status of an "accepted faith", fully equal to the Christian sects. In 1895, civil marriage were first enabled in Hungary. Rosenberg proposed that the Neolog rabbinate should not oppose such unions, citing the concept of Dina D'Malkhutah Dina and also claiming that the Talmud, in Kiddushin 68:2, only banned intermarriage with idol worshipers. His suggestion aroused a severe controversy, and his colleagues condemned him. Immanuel Löw refuted his arguments, and his opinion was not accepted. Rosenberg died in Arad.
