= Alois Dessauer =

German banker (1763–1850)

- Alois Deßauer
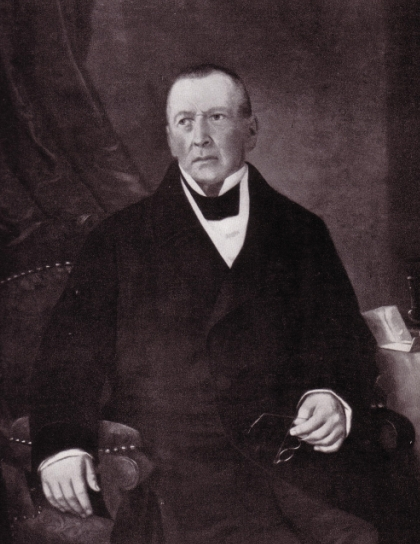
- Alois Dessauer
- Born: Aron Baruch Dessauer; February 21, 1763; Gochsheim, Holy Roman Empire
- Died: April 11, 1850 (aged 87); Aschaffenburg, German Confederation
- Burial place: Aschaffenburg, German Confederation
- Occupation(s): court banker, manufacturer
- Spouse: Anna Elisabeth (married 1792)
- Children: 4
- Parents: Baruch Dessauer (father); Mindel Seligmann (mother)

Alois Joseph Dessauer (born Aron Baruch Dessauer; February 21, 1763, Gochsheim - April 11, 1850, Aschaffenburg) was an Electoral Mainz court banker (Court Jew), a military admodiator (army supplier) as well as a paper manufacturer. He is the grandfather of Philipp Dessauer.

== Life ==
He was the son of the Jewish community leader Baruch Dessauer (?–1772) and Mindel Seligmann (?–1795). He came to Königshofen ob der Tauber (Baden) in 1792 and married Behlasina David, daughter of Joseph David (?–1824), citizen and tradesman in Königshofen, and Henriette Sontheim. She's also a granddaughter of Jacob David (?–1783), a citizen of Königshofen.

In 1798 the merchant, former Churmainz court banker and military recruiter, came to Aschaffenburg with his family. Dessauer was said to have excellent relations with Prince Primate Karl Theodor von Dalberg; nevertheless, social advancement only began after his (Catholic) baptism in 1805.

On August 23, 1805, Aron Baruch, his wife and their 3 children were baptized in the parish church of St. Agatha in Aschaffenburg. When adopting a baptismal name, the first letter was often retained, so Aron became Alois, his wife was given the name Anna Elisabeth and the children were given the names Joseph (1793–1853), Georg (1795–1870) and Karl Friedrich (1799–1845). The fourth child, Franz Johann (1805–1872), was baptized as a Catholic at birth, who later became a father of Philipp Dessauer.

On September 5, 1805, he paid 15 guilders and 34 kreuzer citizens' collection fee and received the city of Aschaffenburg's citizenship on the same day. Dessauer now became active in a wide variety of industries, such as: paper dealer, stone tablet and fine ink manufacturer and founded the Aschaffenburg colored paper factory in 1810. He enjoyed a high reputation among the citizens and became an honorary member of the shooting society in 1805 and a councilor in 1826.

== Literature ==
- Albert Haemmerle: Stammtafel der Familie Dessauer aus Aschaffenburg. Printed as a manuscript. A. Haemmerle, Munich 1962.
- Albert Haemmerle: Die Wasserzeichen des Alois Dessauer, 1763–1850. In: Papiergeschichte, Volume 16, 1966, Issue 3/4, pp. 2–4
