= Újpest =

4th District of Budapest

4th District of Budapest Budapest IV. kerülete Újpest
- District of Budapest
- District IV
- Flag Coat of arms

- Location of District IV in Budapest (shown in grey)
- Coordinates: 47°34′N 19°05′E
- Country: Hungary
- Region: Central Hungary
- City: Budapest
- Established: 1 January 1950
- Quarters: List: Istvántelek; Káposztásmegyer; Megyer; Népsziget; Székesdűlő; Újpest

Government
  - Mayor: Norbert Trippon (DK)

Area
  - Total: 18.82 km^{2} (7.27 sq mi)
  - Rank: 8th

Population (2018)
  - Total: 100,694
  - Rank: 6th
  - Density: 5,350/km^{2} (13,860/sq mi)
- Demonym: negyedik kerületi ("4th districter")
- Time zone: UTC+1 (CET)
  - Summer (DST): UTC+2 (CEST)
- Postal code: 1041 ... 1048
- Website: ujpest.hu

Újpest (Hungarian pronunciation: [ˈuːjpɛʃt]; German: Neu-Pest, English: New Pest) is the 4th District in Budapest, Hungary. It is located on the left bank of the Danube River. The name Újpest means "New Pest" because the city was formed on the border of the city of Pest, Hungary in 1838. Újpest was a village for six decades until 1907 when it became a town. In 1950, the town was unified with Budapest to form Greater Budapest. Since 1950, Újpest has been the 4th District of Budapest.

The football club Újpest FC is named after the area, since they were formed in the district in 1885, and have played there ever since.

== District ==
The district is composed of six parts. Újpest is the largest, but the district also includes Megyer, Káposztásmegyer, Istvántelek, Székesdűlő and the northern tip of the island Népsziget.

== History ==
Isaac Lowy owned a shoe factory that he wanted to move to Pest but was unable to attain a settlement permit because he was Jewish. In 1835, he decided to create a new town where he would build the factory. North of Pest, there was an empty tract of land that was owned by the Károlyi nobles. Lowy bought the land; the deed included the right of religious freedom, the right to self-government, and the right to engage in business. By 1838, 13 Jewish families lived in Újpest; soon after, Christians began moving in.

Famous statues, like Wesselényi Monument, Matthias Corvinus Monument, were cast in bronze by the workshops of Alexander Matthias Beschorner from Újpest.

== Sport ==
- Újpest FC, football team
- Újpesti Törekvés SE, football team
- Újpesti MTE, football team
- Újpest-Rákospalotai AK, defunct football team
- Újpesti TE (men's water polo)
- Újpesti TE (ice hockey)

== Politics ==
The current mayor of IV. District of Budapest is Norbert Trippon (DK).

The District Assembly, elected at the 2019 local government elections, is made up of 21 members (1 Mayor, 14 Individual constituencies MEPs and 6 Compensation List MEPs) divided into this political parties and alliances:

| Party | Seats | Current District Assembly |
|---|---|---|
| Opposition coalition (Note: Coalition of Momentum–DK–MSZP–Dialogue–LMP–Jobbik–UPK.) | 15 | M |
| WZs-ÚE-Fidesz | 6 | |

=== List of mayors ===
| Member | Party | Date |
|---|---|---|
| Tamás Derce | SZDSZ | 1990–2010 |
| Tamás Derce | Ind. | 1990–2010 |
| Zsolt Wintermantel | Fidesz | 2010–2019 |
| Déri Tibor | Momentum | 2019–2024 |
| Déri Tibor | DK | 2019–2024 |
| Norbert Trippon | DK | 2024- |

== Famous residents ==
- Julius Dessauer (b. 1832), rabbi and writer.
- Lipa Goldman (b. 1905) chief rabbi of the Orthodox Jewish Community.
- Yosef Goldman scholar and bookdealer.
- Olivér Halassy (1909–1946), water polo player and freestyle swimmer.
- Isaac Lowy (1793–1847), Hungarian industrialist and founder of Újpest.
- Alexander Rado (1899–1981), Soviet spy.
- Ferenc Szusza (1923–2006), Hungarian footballer
- Ludwig Venetianer (1867–1922), rabbi and writer.

== Gallery ==
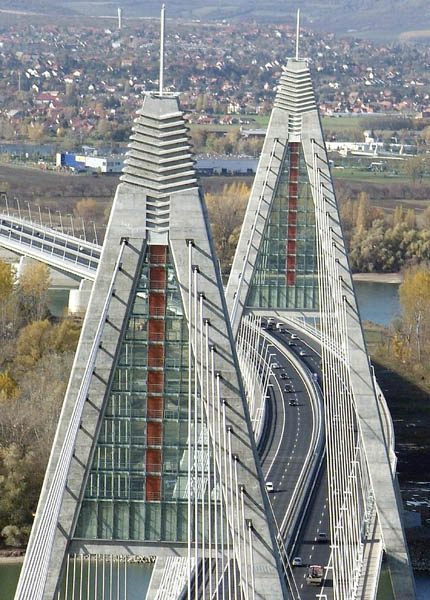
Megyeri bridge

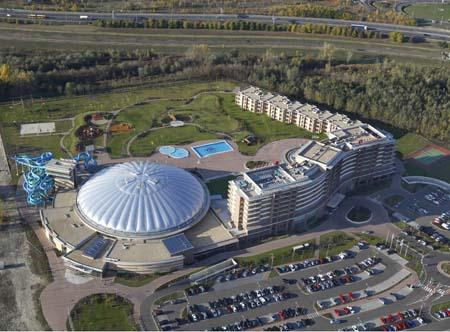
Ramada Resort Aquaworld

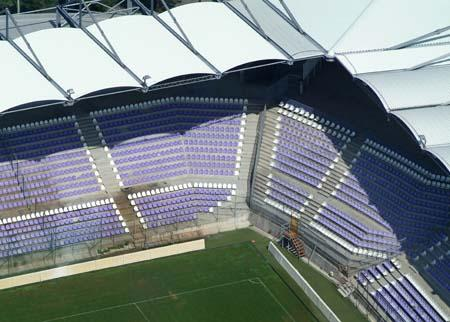
Ute stadium

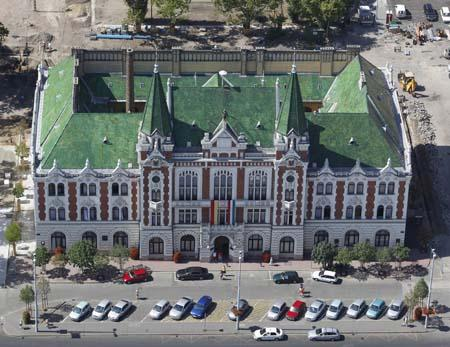
Town Hall

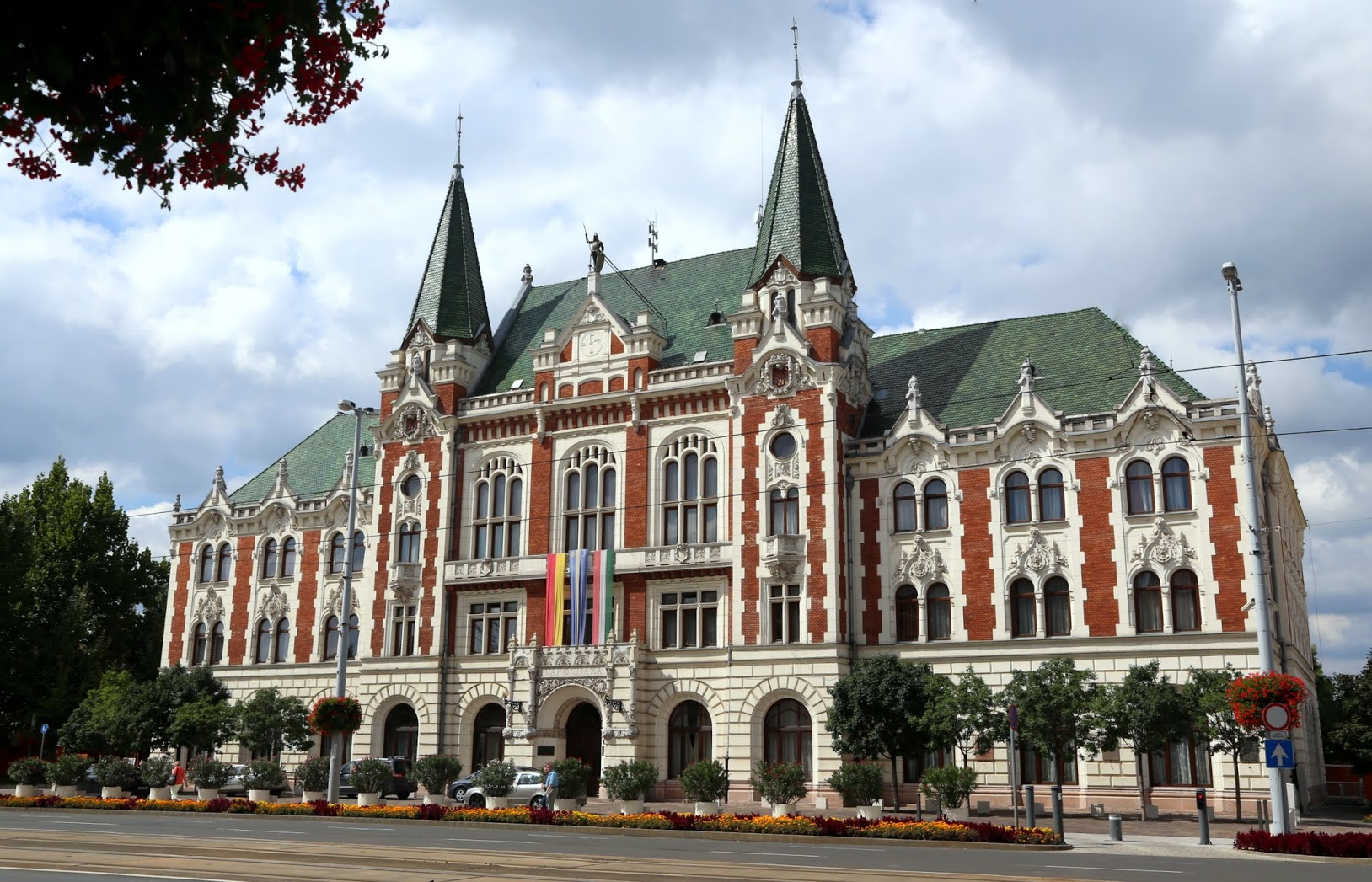
Town Hall

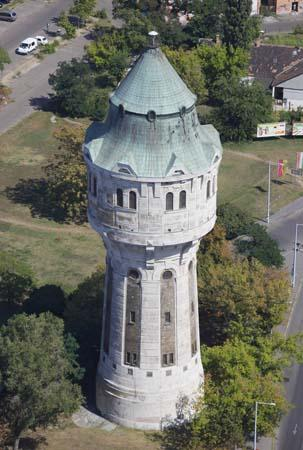
Water tower

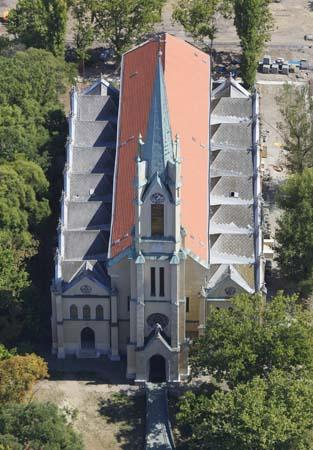
Parish Church

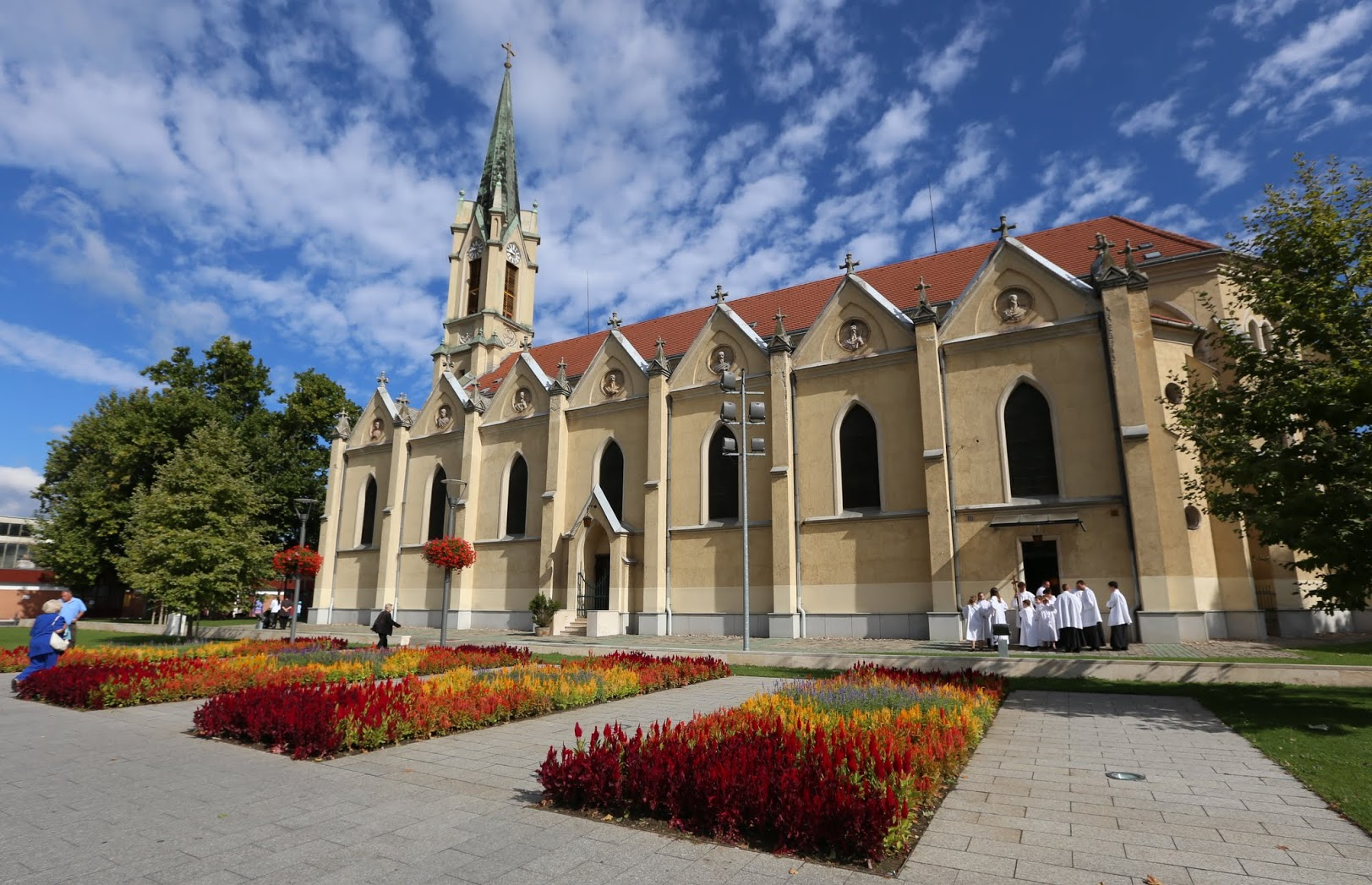
Parish Church

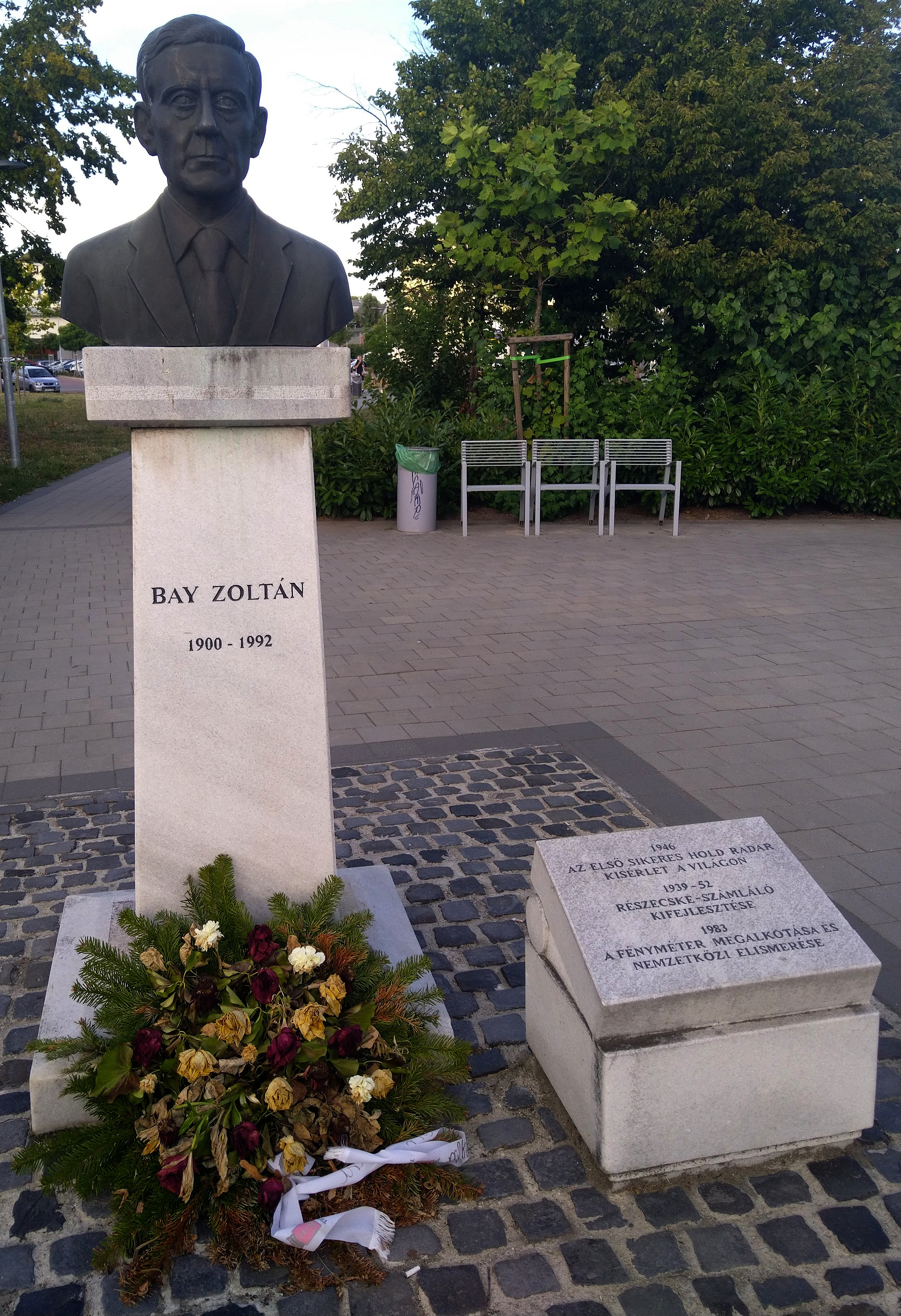
Zoltán Bay monument

== See also ==
- List of districts in Budapest
- Ujpest Synagogue
