= Dessau, Texas =

- Unincorporated community
- Location within Texas Location within the United States
- Coordinates: 30°24′13″N 97°38′18″W
- Country: United States
- State: Texas
- County: Travis
- Elevation: 673 ft (205 m)
- Time zone: UTC-6 (Central (CST))
  - Summer (DST): UTC-5 (CDT)
- Area codes: 512 & 737
- GNIS feature ID: 1379657

Dessau is an unincorporated community in Travis County, in the U.S. state of Texas. It is located within the Greater Austin metropolitan area.

== History ==
Dessau was named for Dessau in Germany. It had a post office from 1886 to 1890 and from 1897 to 1901.

== Geography ==
Dessau is located 11 mi (18 km) northeast of Austin and 2 mi (3.2 km) southwest of Pflugerville in northeastern Travis County.

== Education ==
In 1907, Dessau had a school with one teacher and 40 students. It joined the Pflugerville Independent School District in 1920. Schools that serve the community are Delco Primary School, Dessau Elementary School, Dessau Middle School, and John B. Connally High School.
