= Hans Dessauer =

- Born: 24 June 1869; Aschaffenburg, Kingdom of Bavaria
- Died: 23 October 1926 (aged 57); Aschaffenburg, Germany
- Education: RWTH Aachen University; University of Freiburg; Ludwig-Maximilians-Universität München
- Occupations: Chemist; Business executive
- Organization: Aschaffenburger Buntpapierfabrik
- Children: John H. Dessauer; Guido Dessauer

Hans Dessauer senior (24 June 1869 – 23 October 1926) was a German industrialist and politician.

Dessauer was born in Aschaffenburg in a family of industrialists who owned the Aschaffenburger Buntpapierfabrik, a leading coloured paper factory with a long tradition. His parents were Philipp Dessauer and Maria Elisabeth Vossen, a daughter of the paint manufacturer Franz Vossen in Aachen. Dessauer first attended the Gymnasium in Aschaffenburg, then went to RWTH Aachen University in Aachen. Subsequently, he studied chemistry in Freiburg and Munich and received his doctorate there in 1892 with a thesis on pyrazoline and trimethylen derivates. As a student, Dessauer was an active member of Catholic students' associations.

After graduating, Dessauer worked in the paint factory of his uncle Leo Vossen in Aachen and took over the management of the Paris branch of this company for two years. In 1896 he spent a year at a pulp mill in Wisconsin, USA, and from 1897 he worked in the Aschaffenburg Buntpapierfabrik with his father. After his father's death in 1900 he joined the management of that company.

Dessauer was a member of several associations and industrialists of the Economic Committee of the BVP (Bayerische Volkspartei), and he was also a member of the Aschaffenburg City Council for the Party. For his services he was awarded the title Kommerzienrat (commercial councillor).

His oldest son Hans Dessauer Jr., born in 1905, emigrated from Germany to the United States in 1929 and became known as John H. Dessauer. His son Guido Dessauer, born 1915, joined the management of the family company in 1945.
