= John H. Dessauer =

German-American chemical engineer

- Born: Hans Dessauer; 13 May 1905; Aschaffenburg, Germany
- Died: 12 August 1993 (aged 88); Pittsford, New York
- Education: University of Freiburg; Technical University of Munich; RWTH Aachen University
- Occupation: Chemical engineer
- Organization: Xerox
- Parent: Hans Dessauer
- Relatives: Friedrich Dessauer (uncle); Guido Dessauer (brother)

John H. Dessauer, also known as Hans Dessauer, (13 May 1905 – 12 August 1993) was a German-American chemical engineer and an innovator in developing xerography. He was instrumental in turning a $7 million company of the 1930s into Xerox, a billion-dollar copier company.

== Early years ==
He was born Hans Dessauer in Aschaffenburg in a family of industrialists who owned the Aschaffenburger Buntpapierfabrik, a leading coloured paper factory with a long tradition. His parents were Hans Dessauer and his wife Bertha (née Thywissen). The physicist Friedrich Dessauer was an uncle. He had one older half-sister, four brothers and one sister. The physicist Guido Dessauer was his younger brother.

Dessauer attended the Gymnasium in Aschaffenburg, before studying chemistry in Freiburg where he joined the Katholische Studentenverein Brisgovia, in the Cartellverband. In 1926, he received a B.S. degree from the Technical University of Munich. At the RWTH Aachen University, he earned an M.S. degree in 1927 and his doctorate in 1929 with a thesis on the chemical process industry (Neue Ringisomerisationen in der Camphenreihe).

== Career ==
He left Germany in 1929 and went to the US, initially working at Ansco for six years in Binghamton, New York. He went to work for the Rectigraph Company in Rochester, New York in 1935, which was bought by the Haloid Company. At Haloid, he became director of research in 1938, and was instrumental in turning it from a $7 million company into a billion-dollar copier company, which became the Xerox Corporation. It was Dessauer who spotted an article about electrostatic photography, later known as xerography in Monthly Abstract Bulletin in April 1945 and recognized its potential for copying. Together with Chester Carlson who discovered the process and businessman Joseph C. Wilson, they developed its use for reproducing documents and letters. The copier was first sold in 1959.

During his career at Xerox, Dessauer served as director of research, executive vice president (1959-1968), and vice chairman of the board of directors (1966-1970). He was also a member of the New York State Advisory Council for the Advancement of Industrial Research, an honorary member of the Society for Imaging Science and Technology, as well as a member and councillor of the National Academy of Engineering. He served as a director of both the Catholic Family Center in Rochester and the Rochester Regional Research Library Council. He was a trustee of the St. John Fisher College and the Rochester Museum and Science Center. He was a fellow of the American Institute of Chemists, New York State Academy of Sciences, and the Photographic Society of America. He served on the advisory committee of the University of Rochester, of Harvard College, and of the board of overseers of M.I.T., among others.

Dessauer held honorary degrees from Clarkson University, Fordham University, and Le Moyne College. He was a 1968 medalist with the Industrial Research Institute, and the 1973 Frederik Philips Award recipient from the Institute of Electrical and Electronics Engineers.

== Personal life ==
He married Margaret (née Lee), and they had three children, sons, John and Thomas, and a daughter, Margot. In his later years, Dessauer opened the office of "J. M. D. Associates" in Pittsford, New York, devoted to "...education and religious and charitable works". Dessauer established the Judge David F. Lee and St. Francis Xavier Scholarship at the Fordham University School of Law in honor of his father-in-law, a New York Supreme Court Judge. Dessauer died in Pittsford at the age of 88. A collection of his correspondence, speeches, patents, and photographs is held at the University of Rochester.

== Works ==
- My Years with Xerox, the Billions Nobody Wanted. Doubledays, New York, Garden City, N. Y., Doubleday, 1971. Orbit Publishing Geneva, 1971; Manor Books (June 1979)
- Xerography and related Processes. (with Harold Ernest Clark) Focal P., May 1965
- Neue Ringisomerisationen in der Camphenreihe. Dissertation. RWTH Aachen University, Aschaffenburg: Kirsch, 1929
