= Guido Dessauer =

German physicist (1915–2012)

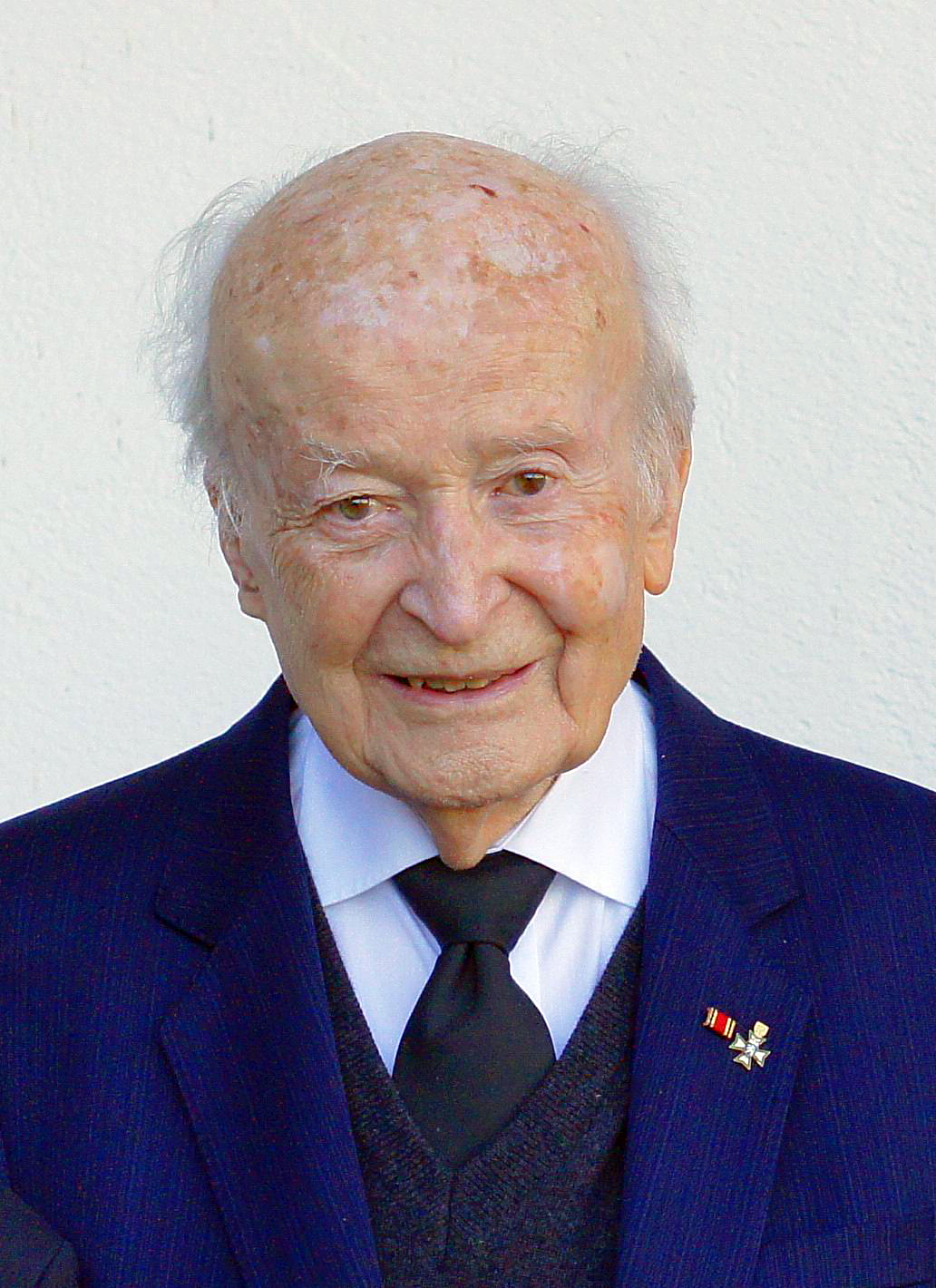
- Dessauer in 2010
- Born: 7 November 1915; Aschaffenburg, Kingdom of Bavaria, German Empire
- Died: 13 January 2012 (aged 96); Tutzing, Bavaria, Germany
- Education: Ludwig-Maximilians-Universität München; Graz University of Technology
- Occupations: Physicist; Business executive; Art collector; Academic teacher
- Organizations: Aschaffenburger Buntpapierfabrik; Graz University of Technology; Rotary Club
- Children: Gabriel Dessauer
- Father: Hans Dessauer
- Relatives: Friedrich Dessauer (uncle); John H. Dessauer (brother)

Guido Dessauer (7 November 1915 – 13 January 2012) was a German physicist, pioneer in paper engineering, business executive, writer, art collector, patron of the arts, and academic. Born into a family of paper industrialists, he worked as an aerospace engineer during World War II and was an executive of the family's coloured paper factory in Aschaffenburg from 1945. He was an honorary citizen of Austria for saving 300 jobs in Styria in the 1960s. He earned a Ph.D. from the Graz University of Technology in his late 50s and became an honorary professor there. Interested in art, he collected bozzetti (models for sculpture) for 50 years and initiated the career of Horst Janssen as a lithographer.

== Life ==
Guido Dessauer was born in Aschaffenburg on 7 November 1915 to a family of industrialists who owned the Aschaffenburger Buntpapierfabrik, a leading coloured-paper factory with a long tradition. His parents were Hans Dessauer and Bertha, née Thywissen. Dessauer's older brother was Hans Dessauer, known as John H. Dessauer. He was also a nephew of the scientist Friedrich Dessauer, a member of parliament. Dessauer attended a gymnasium in Aschaffenburg that taught the Greek and Latin languages. Later in life he regretted that he had not learned Hebrew, because he would have liked to read what his Jewish ancestors had written. He studied physics at the Ludwig-Maximilians-Universität München, and was also interested in art and history. During World War II he worked in aerospace research. Later he was a pioneer in the paper industry and registered more than 30 patents. In 1945, he entered the management of the Aschaffenburger Buntpapierfabrik, becoming its technical managing director in 1951. Beginning in 1970, he directed a research department at another paper producer, Feldmühle in Düsseldorf.

In 1985 Dessauer was appointed honorary professor at the Institut für Papier-, Zellstoff- und Fasertechnik (Institute for Paper, Pulp and Fibre Technology) of the Graz University of Technology, where he had earned his Ph.D. in 1972.

Dessauer was a member of the Rotary Club from 1957 onward. As a founding member of the Rotary Club of Aschaffenburg in 1958, he was awarded honorary membership of the club on the occasion of its 50th anniversary. He was also an honorary member of the International Association of Paper Historians.

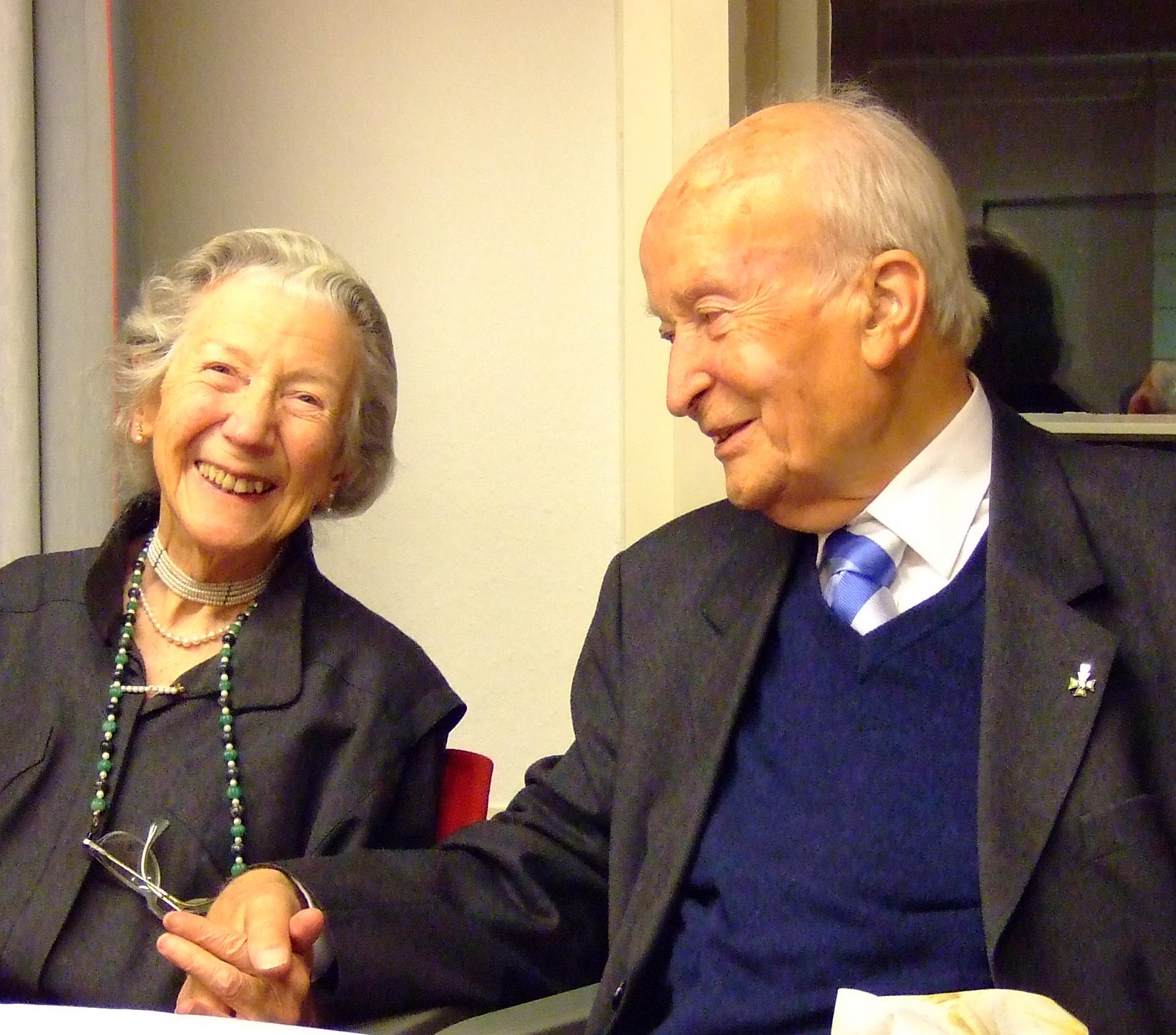
Gabrielle and Guido Dessauer, 2007

Dessauer was married in 1949 to Gabrielle von Keller (20 December 1916 – 22 February 2010), a daughter of the diplomat Friedrich von Keller. They had four children, Irene, Franziska, Friederike, and Gabriel Dessauer, who became the Kantor at St. Bonifatius, Wiesbaden. They lived in Tutzing, where he died on 13 January 2012.

== Art ==
Dessauer collected European sculptures, especially three-dimensional models for sculpture called maquettes or bozzetti. They are of special interest to experts because they show the creative process. The Sammlung Dessauer (Dessauer Collection) of 340 pieces from several periods up to the Klassische Moderne era is the largest private collection of bozzetti in Germany. A selection of 72 pieces from the Baroque era was shown in 2002 in the Germanisches Nationalmuseum in Nuremberg, the Alte Galerie (Old Gallery) of the Landesmuseum Joanneum in Graz, the Kunstmuseum "Kloster Unser Lieben Frauen" in Magdeburg, and the Augustinermuseum in Freiburg, under the title Kleine Ekstasen – Barocke Meisterwerke aus der Sammlung Dessauer (Little ecstasies – Baroque master works from the Dessauer Collection). It showed bozzetti from the baroque, rococo, and Classicism eras by sculptors including Antonio Canova, François Duquesnoy, Etienne-Maurice Falconet, Jean-Antoine Houdon, Camillo Rusconi, and Philipp Jakob Straub.

In the early 1950s, Dessauer commissioned a portrait of his father-in-law from Horst Janssen, followed by portraits of other family members. Janssen was able to create his first lithographs using the technical equipment at the Aschaffenburger Buntpapierfabrik.

== Awards ==
In 1964, Dessauer was awarded honorary citizenship in Austria for saving 300 jobs while serving as a member of the board of the paper factory in Niklasdorf. He received the Großes Goldenes Ehrenzeichen des Landes Steiermark (in German) for Verdienste um die steirische Papierindustrie, Kunstförderung (Services to the Styrian paper industry, patronage of the arts).

In 2008, Dessauer was awarded the German Bundesverdienstkreuz am Bande (Cross of the Order of Merit).

== Publications ==
- Horst Janssen und Aschaffenburg (Horst Janssen, Brigitte Schad, Guido Dessauer, Reiner Meyer), Aschaffenburg 2002, ISBN 3-87707-593-2
- Wolkenkleister, Marmor und Brokat: Historische Buntpapiere (Gisela Reschke, Guido Dessauer "Über Moden und Zyklen in der Rezeption von Kunst und Kunsthandwerk" About fashions and cycles in the reception of art and crafts), Berlin 1997, ISBN 3-89500-013-2
- Papierzerfall: Ursachen und Konsequenzen, Ein Beitrag von Prof. Dr. Guido Dessauer, Graz Forum Bestandserhaltung of the University of Münster 2001
