= Chananya Yom Tov Lipa Goldman =

Chananya Yom Tov Lipa Goldman (1905/1907 – July 6, 1980) was a renowned Orthodox rabbi, dayan, and publisher in Hungary and the United States.

Goldman was born in Neupest (Hungarian: Újpest), a suburb of Budapest, Hungary. His father, Rabbi Yosef Goldman, was the chief rabbi and Av Beit Din of the Orthodox Jewish community. In 1926, he became a rabbi in Romania, and in 1934 in Bessarabia (then part of Romania). In 1938, after his father died, he was given his father's position as chief rabbi and Av Beit Din of the Orthodox Jewish community in Neupest.

To save his family from the 1944 Nazi invasion of Hungary, he obtained false papers that certified them as non-Jews, a ruse that enabled them to live on a farm disguised as gentiles and thereby escape deportation to concentration or death camps by the Nazis. After the war, Goldman's family lived in Hamburg, Germany, for a period of time. In 1950, Goldman, his wife, and their eight children arrived in America aboard the Marine Shark.

In the United States, Goldman was a dayan and publisher of seforim. He published a Shas and various other seforim. His Shas was one of the most popular editions available at the time. Initially, he lived on the Lower East Side, Manhattan, then in Crown Heights, Brooklyn, and finally in Boro Park, Brooklyn, where he served as rabbi of a synagogue known as "Naipest" (namesake of his previous rabbinate, in Hungary). He died in Boro Park on July 6, 1980.
