= Julius Dessauer =

Hungarian rabbi and writer

Julius Dessauer (1832–1883) was a Hungarian rabbi and writer.

Dessauer was born in Neutra to Gabriel L. Dessauer. He was for some years rabbi at Újpest.

== Bibliography ==
- Die Fünf Bücher Moses. Nebst dem Raschi-Commentar, Punktirt, Leichtfasslich Uebersetzt und mit AnmerkungenVersehen, Budapest, 1863 archive.org
- Schulchan Aruch, Orach Hayyim, Deutsch Bearbeitet, 1868
- Spruch-Lexikon des Talmud und Midrash, 1876
- Schlüssel zum Gebetbuche, 1878
- Perlenschatz: Philosophische Sentenzen in Alphabetischer Reihenfolge, 1880
- Der Jüdische Humorist, 1899
