= Leopold Anhalt-Dessau =

Leopold Anhalt-Dessau may refer to:

- Leopold I, Prince of Anhalt-Dessau (1676–1747)
- Leopold II, Prince of Anhalt-Dessau (1700–1751)
- Leopold III, Duke of Anhalt-Dessau (1740–1817)
- Leopold IV, Duke of Anhalt-Dessau (1794–1871)
