= Izsák Lőwy =

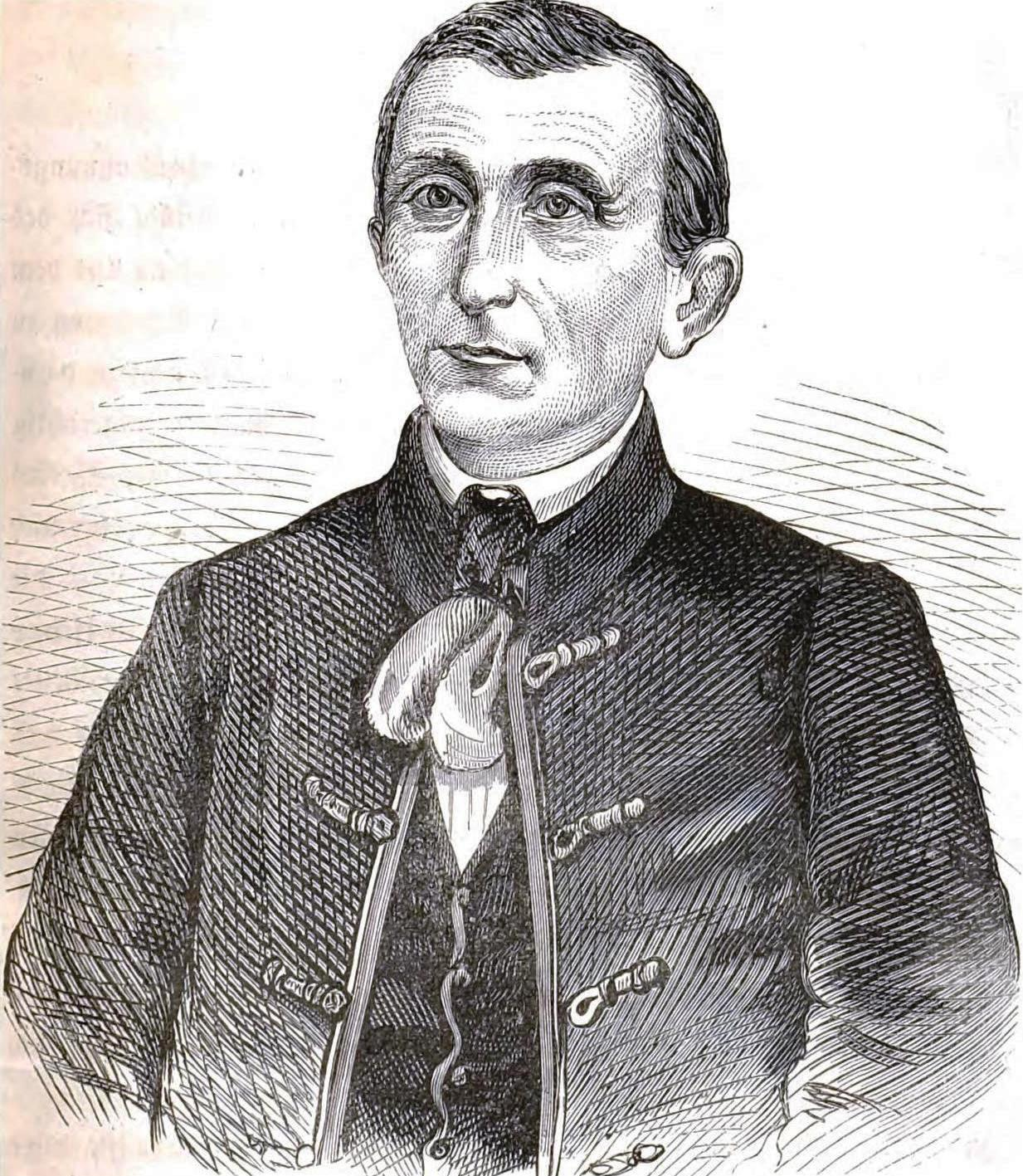
lsak Lövy

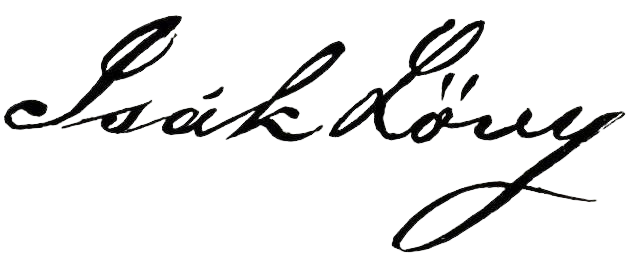
signature

Izsák Lőwy (also known as Isaac Lowy; 1793, Nagysurány – 8 April 1847, Újpest) was a Hungarian industrialist and founder of the city of Újpest (now a district of Budapest, Hungary). He created the city name Újpest (New Pest). He was the leader of the Jewish community and the town's first judge. In 1866 a street was named after Izsák Lőwy in his town (next to present Újpest-Városkapu metro station).
