= Tiroche Auction House =

Auction house in Israel

- Company type: Auction service
- Founded: 1992
- Founders: Dov Hazan; Mickey Tiroche
- Headquarters: Herzliya Pituah, Israel
- Services: Art auctions, private sales, online auctions
- Website: www.tiroche.co.il

Tiroche Auction House (Hebrew: תירוש מכירות פומביות) is an auction house in Israel.

== History ==
During the 1950s, Jean Tiroche, a Holocaust survivor, established one of the first art galleries in Tel Aviv. Tiroche's daughter Orna later married Dov Hazan. The couple operated two art galleries in Tel Aviv and Jaffa for approximately 20 years.

Tiroche Auction House was founded in 1992 by Hazan and his brother-in-law, Mickey Tiroche, the son of Jean Tiroche. The auction house is currently managed by Hazan together with his children Galia and Amitai Hazan Tiroche, who joined the business in 2007.

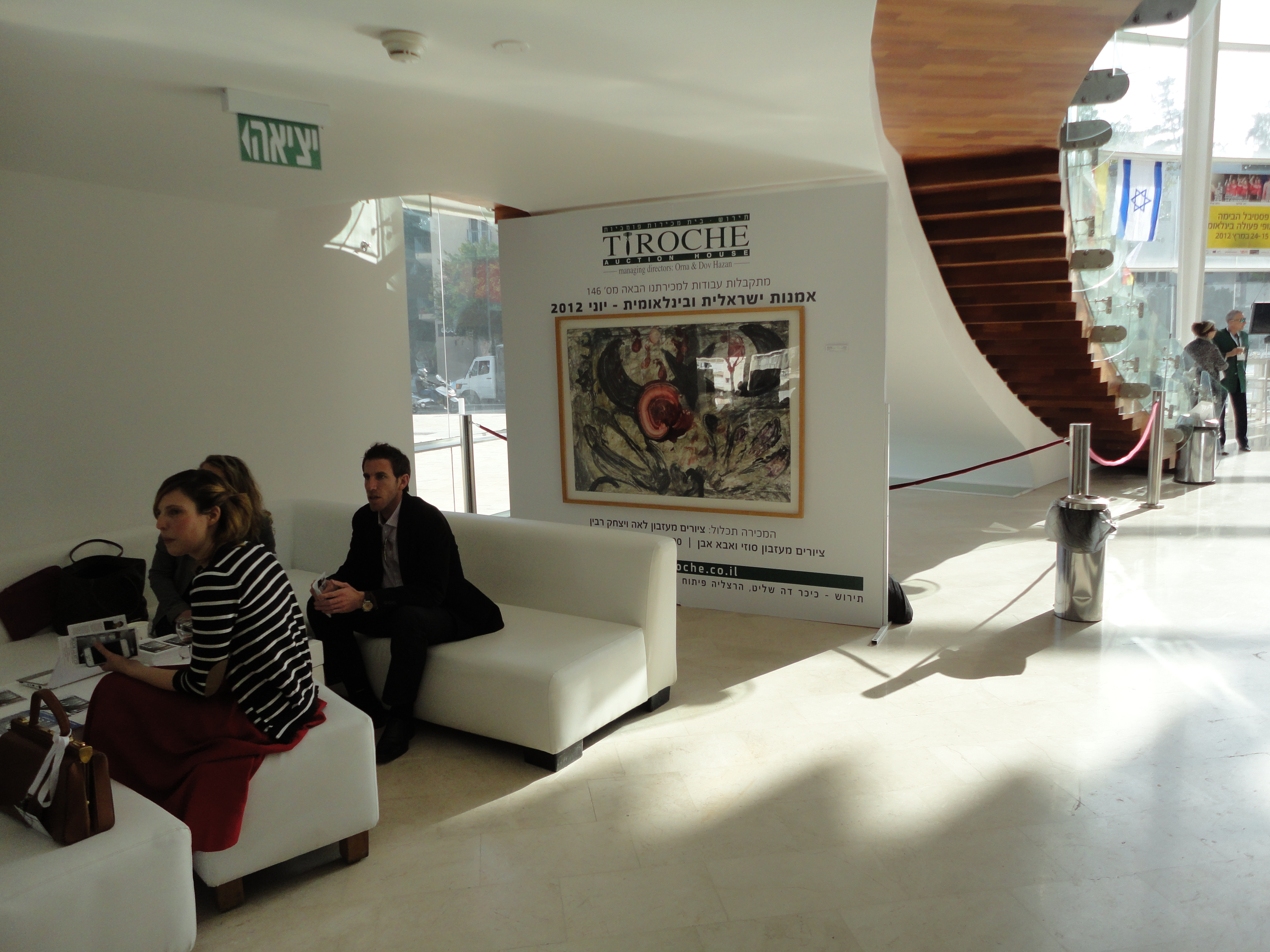
Tiroche Auction House poster

It holds four large auctions a year of Israeli and international art (paintings) and decorative art; silverware, jewelry, Judaica, clocks, carpets, porcelain and more.

It specializes in the evaluation and sale of art. Tiroche enables the sale of art through live auctions, bi-weekly online auctions, private sales and an online store.

Auctions of important estates include the estates of Baroness Batsheva de Rothschild, Suzy and Abba Eban, Ephraim Kishon, Yitzhak Rabin, Golda Meir and many others. In 2014, Tiroche was chosen by the court to execute the auction of the IDB Holdings art collection as part of the debt arrangement, in which 100% of the items were sold. Records were set for many Israeli artists such as Lea Nikel, Raffi Lavie, Nir Hod, Eli Shamir and more. Tiroche also holds price records for most Israeli artists, such as Yosef Zaritsky, Moshe Gershuni and Moshe Kupferman.

In recent years, the Auction house staff has volunteered to donate time and experience to carry out auctions for the Israeli Spirit Association, Schneider Children's Hospital, Beit Issie Shapiro," Latet", "One of Nine", and more.

== See also ==
- Visual arts in Israel
