= Ory Dessau =

Israeli curator and writer

Ory Dessau (Hebrew: אורי דסאו) is an art curator and writer, based in Ghent, Belgium.

He has collaborated with museums such as the Neue Nationalgalerie, Berlin, S.M.A.K., Ghent, Tel Aviv Museum of Art and Moderna Museet Malmö.

One of his renowned works, "Guess who died" , explored the image and physiognomy of Palestinian late president Yasser Arafat.

In July 2007 Dessau was chosen to curate the annual "Omanut Haaretz" ("Art of the Country") exhibition at the Sukkot holiday in September .
