= Ferdinand Dessoir =

German actor (1836–1892)

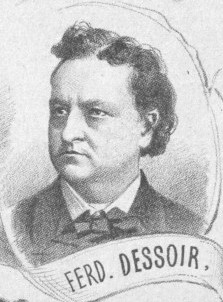
Ferdinand Dessoir 1889

Ferdinand August Dessoir, born Anton August Ferdinand Dessauer (January 29, 1836, Breslau – April 15, 1892, Dresden) was a German actor. He was the son of Leopold Dessauer (1810-1874) and Leopold's first wife Therese Dessoir (née Reimann) (1810-1866). Leopold and Therese were married in 1835, but they separated only a year later in 1836.

Ferdinand was trained for the stage by Werner Mannheim, and made his début in 1852 as the Prince in Dorf und Stadt. In the following year he went to Mainz, where he remained until 1855, when he appeared at Heidelberg. Vienna was his next engagement, in 1856; followed in 1857 by Stettin; 1857–61, Leipzig; 1861–63, Bremen; 1863–64, Weimar. From 1864 to 1867 he played at the Hoftheater in Berlin; after which he returned to Weimar, in 1868. He next went to the Lobetheater in Breslau, in 1868–69. The following seven years were spent at the Hoftheater, Dresden; from 1877 to 1878 at the Thalia Theater in Hamburg; from 1878 to 1879 at the Residenz Theater in Dresden; and in 1880 he played at Prague.

Dessauer became insane during a performance, and never acted again. His principal roles were Kaufmann Bloom, Mephisto, Falstaff, Muley Hassan, Riccaut, Chalisac, and Hans Lange.
