= Ludwig Dessoir =

German actor (1810–1874)

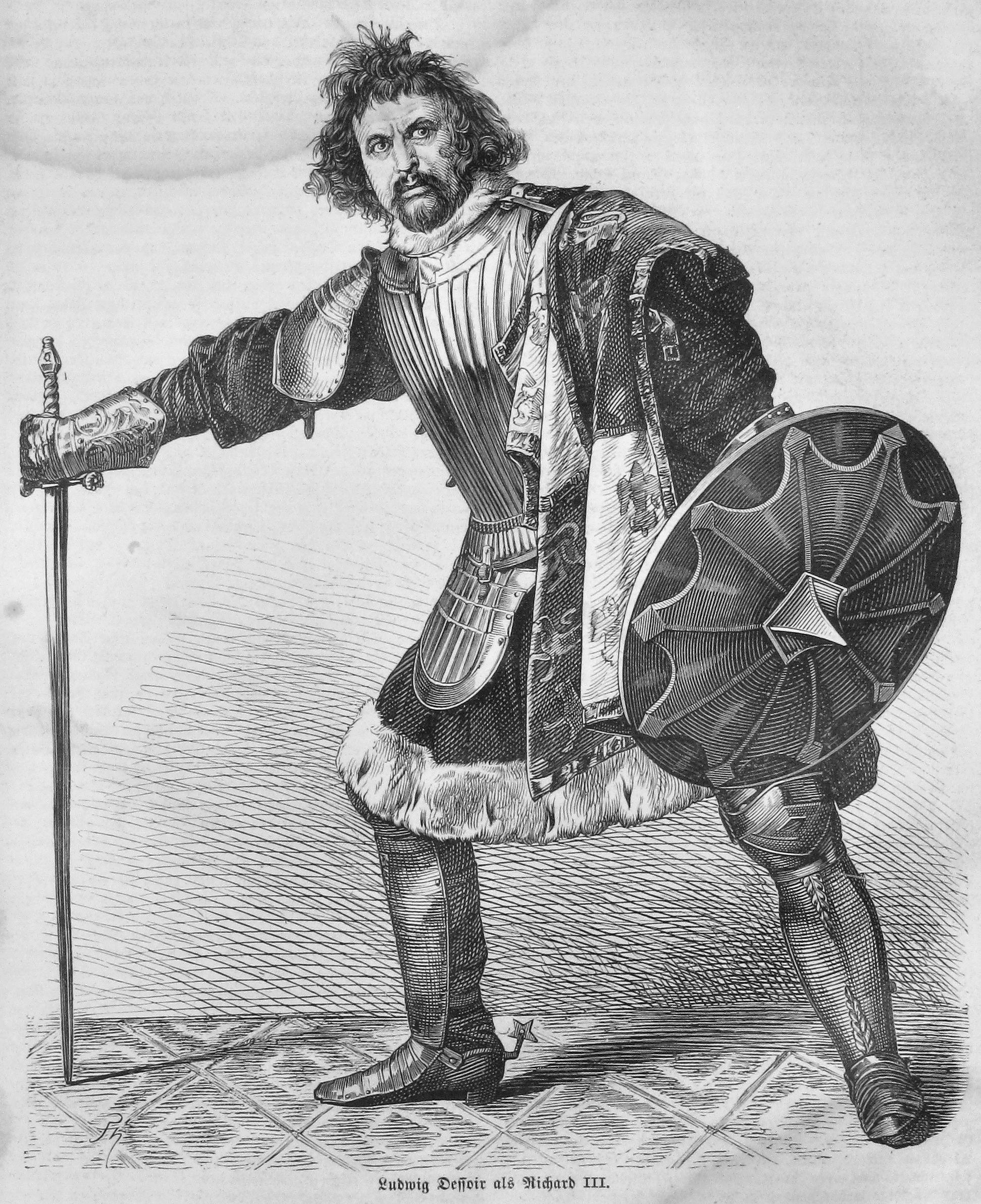
Ludwig Dessoir as Richard III

Ludwig Dessoir, original name Leopold Dessauer (15 December 1810 – 30 December 1874) was a German actor born in Posen, the son of a Jewish tradesman. He made his first appearance on the stage there in 1824 in a small part. After some experience at the theatre in Posen and on tour, he was engaged at Leipzig from 1834 to 1836. Then he was attached to the municipal theatre of Breslau, and in 1837 appeared at Prague, Brno, Vienna and Budapest, where he accepted an engagement which lasted until 1839. He succeeded Karl Devrient at Karlsruhe, and went in 1847 to Berlin, where he acted Othello and Hamlet with great success, he received a permanent engagement at that theatre. From 1849 to 1872, when he retired on a pension, he played 110 parts, frequently on tour, and in 1853 acting in London. He died in 1874 in Berlin.

Dessoir was twice married; his first wife, Theresa, a popular actress (1810–1866), was separated from him a year after marriage; his second wife went mad on the death of her child. By his first wife Dessoir had one son, the actor Ferdinand Dessoir (1836–1892). In spite of certain physical disabilities Ludwig Dessoir's skill made him famous, especially as an interpreter of Shakespeare's characters.
