= Friedrich Dessauer =

German philosopher and physicist (1881–1963)

Friedrich Dessauer (19 July 1881 – 16 February 1963) was a German physicist, a philosopher, a socially engaged entrepreneur and a journalist.

Friedrich Dessauer was born in Aschaffenburg, Kingdom of Bavaria, German Empire. As a young man he was fascinated by new discoveries in the natural sciences. He was particularly interested in the X-rays discovered by Röntgen and their medical applications. After attending the humanistic Gymnasium in Aschaffenburg, he studied electrical engineering and physics at the Technische Universität Darmstadt and the Ludwig-Maximilians-Universität München. Due to radiation damage during his research on the use of X-rays, his face was badly damaged, and he was repeatedly treated with plastic surgery. In connection with this, he was released from military service. Due to the death of his father, he initially interrupted his studies, continued in 1914 at Goethe University Frankfurt and then completed it in 1917. From 1924 to 1933, he was a Zentrum party member of the Reichstag, the German Parliament.

A practicing Catholic with a Jewish grandparent, he was imprisoned by the Nazis when they came to power for his opposition to Hitler. He was released at request of the Turkish government, who invited him to Istanbul University, where he was made chair of the institute. Here he worked together with Erich Uhlmann to develop medical applications of X-rays in Turkey. He moved to the University of Fribourg in 1937 to become the chair of experimental physics.

On 16 February 1963, Dessauer died from radioactive contamination. His name was added to the Monument to the X-ray and Radium Martyrs of All Nations in Hamburg, Germany.
