= John Hancock Center =

Skyscraper in Chicago, Illinois

875 North Michigan Avenue

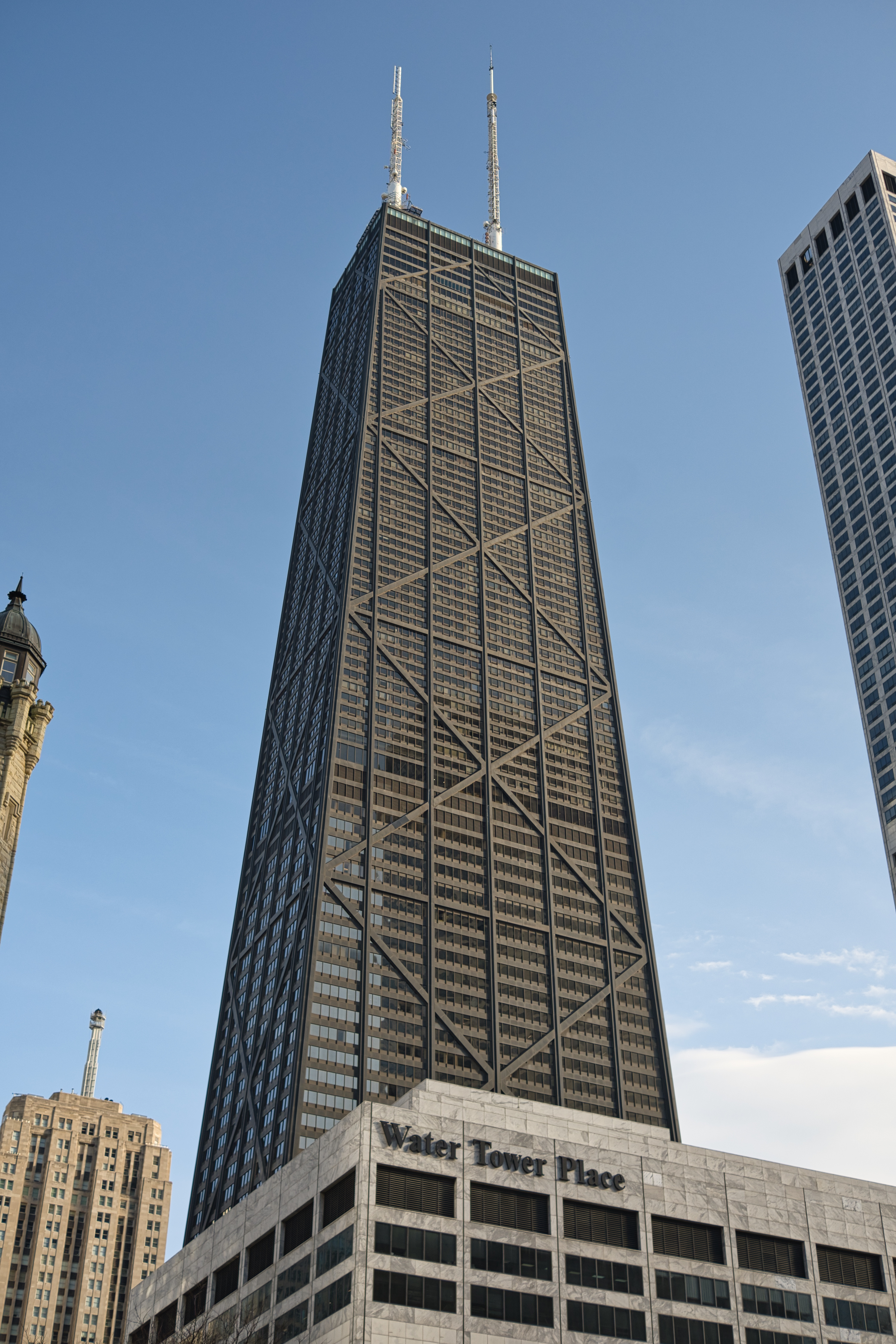
- 875 North Michigan Avenue in 2022, viewed from Michigan Avenue

- Location within Chicago metropolitan area Location within Illinois Location within the United States

Record height
- Tallest in Chicago from 1969 to 1973^{[I]}
- Preceded by: Richard J. Daley Center
- Surpassed by: Willis Tower

General information
- Status: Completed
- Architectural style: Structural Expressionism
- Location: Chicago, Illinois, U.S., 875 North Michigan Avenue (additional entrances at 175 East Delaware Place and 170 East Chestnut Street)
- Coordinates: 41.8988°N 87.6230°W
- Construction started: 1965
- Completed: 1969; 57 years ago
- Cost: US$100 million ($878 million in 2025 dollars)
- Owner: The Hearn Company

Height
- Architectural: 1,128 ft (344 m)
- Tip: 1,499 ft (457 m)
- Roof: 1,128 ft (344 m)
- Top floor: 1,054 ft (321 m)
- Observatory: 1,030 ft (314 m)

Technical details
- Floor count: 100
- Floor area: 2,799,973 sq ft (260,126 m^{2})
- Lifts/elevators: 50, made by Otis Elevator Company

Design and construction
- Architects: Bruce Graham & Fazlur Rahman Khan; Skidmore, Owings and Merrill
- Developer: John Hancock Insurance
- Structural engineer: Skidmore, Owings & Merrill LLP (SOM)
- Main contractor: Tishman Construction Co.

Website
- 875northmichiganavenue.com

875 North Michigan Avenue (formerly known as and still commonly referred to as the John Hancock Center) is a 100-story, 1,128-foot-tall (344-meter) skyscraper located in Chicago, Illinois. Located in the Magnificent Mile district, the building was designed by Peruvian-American chief designer Bruce Graham and Bangladeshi-American structural engineer Fazlur Rahman Khan of Skidmore, Owings and Merrill (SOM). When the building topped out on May 6, 1968, it was the second-tallest building in the world after the Empire State Building, in New York City, and the tallest in Chicago. It is currently the fifth-tallest building in Chicago and the fourteenth-tallest in the United States, behind the Aon Center in Chicago and ahead of the Comcast Technology Center in Philadelphia. When measured to the top of its antenna masts, it stands at 1,500 feet (457 m).

The building is home to several offices and restaurants, as well as about 700 condominiums; at the time of its completion, it contained the highest residence in the world. The building was originally named for John Hancock Mutual Life Insurance Company, a developer and original tenant of the building, which itself was named for the U.S. Founding Father John Hancock. In 2018, John Hancock Insurance, years after leaving the building, requested that its name be removed; the owner is seeking another naming rights deal.

From the 95th-floor restaurant, which closed in late 2023, diners were able to look out at Chicago and Lake Michigan. The observatory (360 Chicago), which competes with the Willis Tower's Skydeck, has a 360° view of the city, up to four states, and a distance of over 80 miles (130 km). 360 Chicago is home to TILT, a moving platform that leans visitors over the edge of the skyscraper to a 30-degree angle, a full bar with local selections, Chicago's only open-air SkyWalk, and also features free interactive high-definition touchscreens in six languages. The 44th-floor sky lobby features the highest indoor swimming pool in the United States.

== History ==
=== 20th century ===
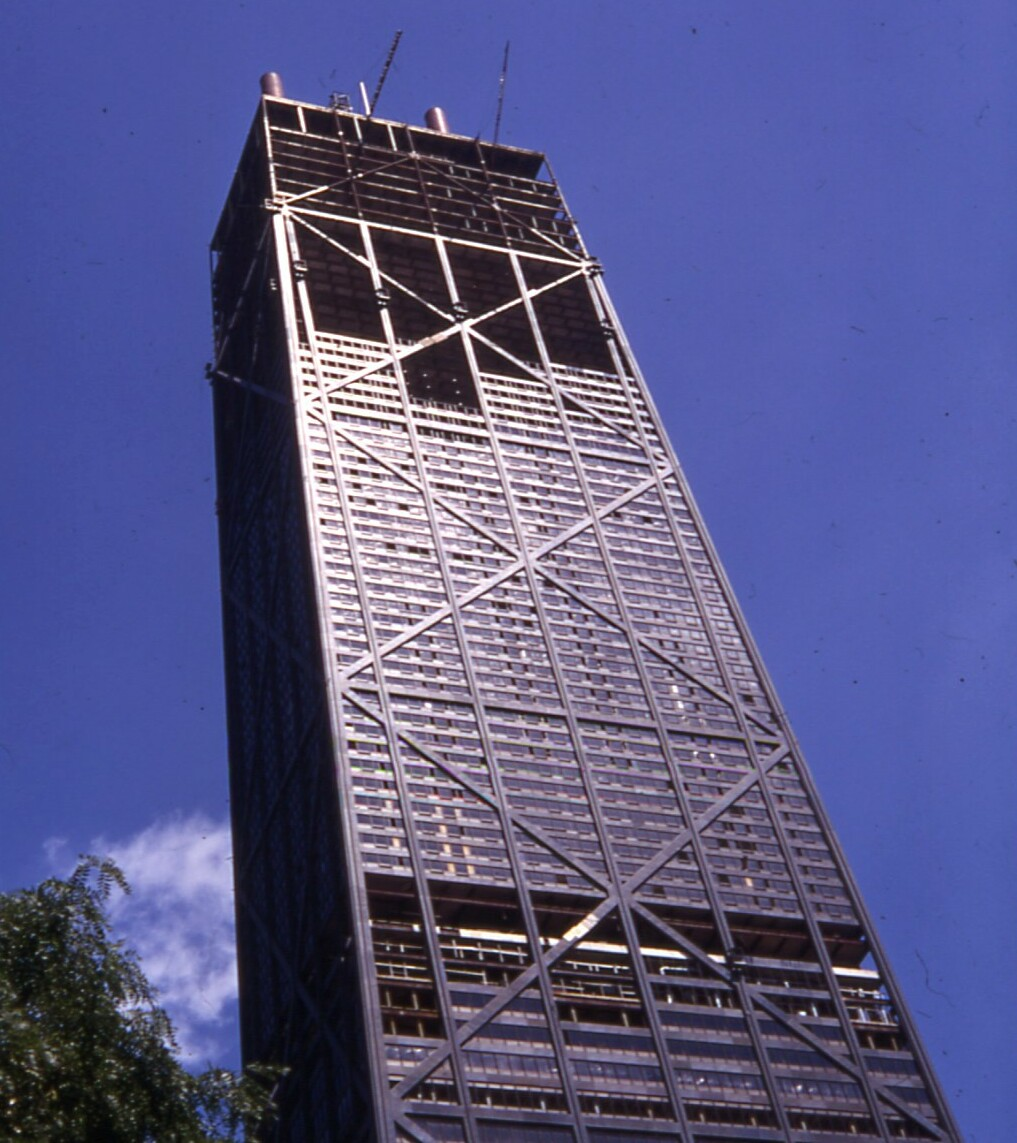
The John Hancock Center under construction, August 1968

The project, which would become the world's second tallest building at opening, was conceived and owned by Jerry Wolman in late 1964. The project was financed by John Hancock Mutual Life Insurance Company. Construction of the tower was interrupted in 1967 due to a flaw in an innovative engineering method used to pour concrete in stages, that was discovered when the building was 20 stories high. The engineers were getting the same soil settlements for the 20 stories that had been built as what they had expected for the entire 99 stories. This forced the owner to stop development until the engineering problem could be resolved, resulting in a credit crunch. The situation is similar to the one faced during the construction of 111 West Wacker, then known as the Waterview Tower. Wolman's bankruptcy resulted in John Hancock taking over the project, which retained the original design, architect, engineer, and main contractor.

The building's first resident was Ray Heckla, the original building engineer, responsible for the residential floors from 44 to 92. Heckla moved his family in April 1969, before the building was completed.

The 1988 film Poltergeist III was set at the John Hancock Center and was filmed in early 1987.

=== 21st century ===
On December 10, 2006, the non-residential portion of the building was sold by San Francisco–based Shorenstein Properties for $385 million (Note: equivalent to $615 million in 2025) and was purchased by a joint venture of Chicago-based Golub & Company and the Whitehall Street Real Estate Funds. Shorenstein Properties had bought the building in 1998 for $220 million. (Note: equivalent to $435 million in 2025)

Golub defaulted on its debt and the building was acquired in 2012 by Deutsche Bank, who subsequently carved up the building. The venture of Deutsche Bank and New York–based NorthStar Realty Finance paid an estimated $325 million (Note: equivalent to $456 million in 2025) for debt on 875 North Michigan Avenue in 2012 after Shorenstein Properties defaulted on $400 million (Note: equivalent to $561 million in 2025) in loans. The observation deck was sold to Paris-based Montparnasse 56 Group for between $35 million and $45 million (Note: equivalent to $49.1 million–$63.1 million in 2025) in July 2012. That same month, Prudential Real Estate Investors acquired the retail and restaurant space for almost $142 million. (Note: equivalent to almost $199 million in 2025) In November 2012, Boston-based American Tower Corp affiliate paid $70 million (Note: equivalent to $98.2 million in 2025) for the antennas. In June 2013, a venture of Chicago-based real estate investment firm Hearn Co., New York–based investment firm Mount Kellett Capital Management L.P. and San Antonio–based developer Lynd Co. closed on the expected acquisition of 875 North Michigan Avenue's 856,000 square feet (79,500 m^{2}) of office space and 710-car parking deck. The Chicago firm did not disclose a price, but sources said it was about $145 million. (Note: equivalent to $200 million in 2025) This was the last step in that piecemeal sale process. In May 2016, Hearn Co. announced that they were seeking buyers for the naming rights with possible signage rights for the building.

Hustle up the Hancock is an annual stair climb race up the 94 floors from the Michigan Avenue level to the observation deck. It is held on the last Sunday of February. The climb benefits Respiratory Health Association. The record time as of 2007 is 9 minutes 30 seconds.

The building is home to the transmitter of Univision's WGBO-DT (channel 66), while all other full-power television stations in Chicago broadcast from Willis Tower. The City Colleges of Chicago's WYCC (channel 20) transmitted from the building until November 2017, when it departed the air as part of the 2016 FCC spectrum auction.

On February 12, 2018, John Hancock Insurance requested that its name and logos throughout the building's interior be removed immediately; John Hancock had not had a naming-rights deal with the skyscraper's owners since 2013. The building's name was subsequently changed to its street address as 875 North Michigan Avenue.

The Signature Room restaurant on the 95th and 96th floors was listed for sale in April 2023 and closed that September, with ownership citing "severe economic hardship" that they attributed to the impact of the earlier COVID-19 pandemic. 360 CHICAGO, which operated the 94th-floor observation deck, bought the building's 95th and 96th floors in June 2024. The next year, it was announced that 875 North Michigan's observation deck would be expanded into the former Signature Room space. Skidmore, Owings & Merrill (the architectural firm that designed the building in the 1970s) was hired to redesign these two floors.

=== Incidents ===
On November 11, 1981, Veterans Day, high-rise firefighting and rescue advocate Dan Goodwin, for the purpose of calling attention to the inability to rescue people trapped in the upper floors of skyscrapers, successfully climbed the building's exterior wall. Wearing a wetsuit and using a climbing device that enabled him to ascend the I-beams on the building's side, Goodwin battled repeated attempts by the Chicago Fire Department to knock him off. Fire Commissioner William Blair ordered Chicago firemen to stop Goodwin by directing a fully engaged fire hose at him and by blasting fire axes through nearby glass from the inside. Fearing for Goodwin's life, Mayor Jane Byrne intervened and allowed him to continue to the top.

On December 18, 1997, comedian Chris Farley was found dead in his apartment on the 60th floor of the building.

On March 9, 2002, part of a scaffold fell 43 stories after being torn loose by wind gusts around 60 mph (100 km/h) crushing several cars, killing three people in two of them. The remaining part of the stage swung back-and-forth in the gusts repeatedly slamming against the building, damaging cladding panels, breaking windows, and sending pieces onto the street below.

On November 21, 2015, a fire broke out in an apartment on the 50th floor of the building. The Chicago Fire Department was able to extinguish the fire after an hour and a half; five people suffered minor injuries.

On February 11, 2018, a fire in a car on the seventh floor required approximately 150 firefighters to extinguish.

On November 16, 2018, an express elevator cable broke. Initial reports stated that an elevator with six passengers plunged 84 stories from the 95th to 11th floor. Since express elevators are not accessible from floors within the express zone, a team of firefighters had to break through a brick wall from the parking garage to extricate the passengers, none of whom suffered injuries. Elevators to the 95th/96th floor were closed thereafter pending investigation. Subsequent investigation documented only a controlled descent from the 20th floor to the 11th floor.

On January 5, 2022, a piece of cladding fell from the building.

== Architecture ==
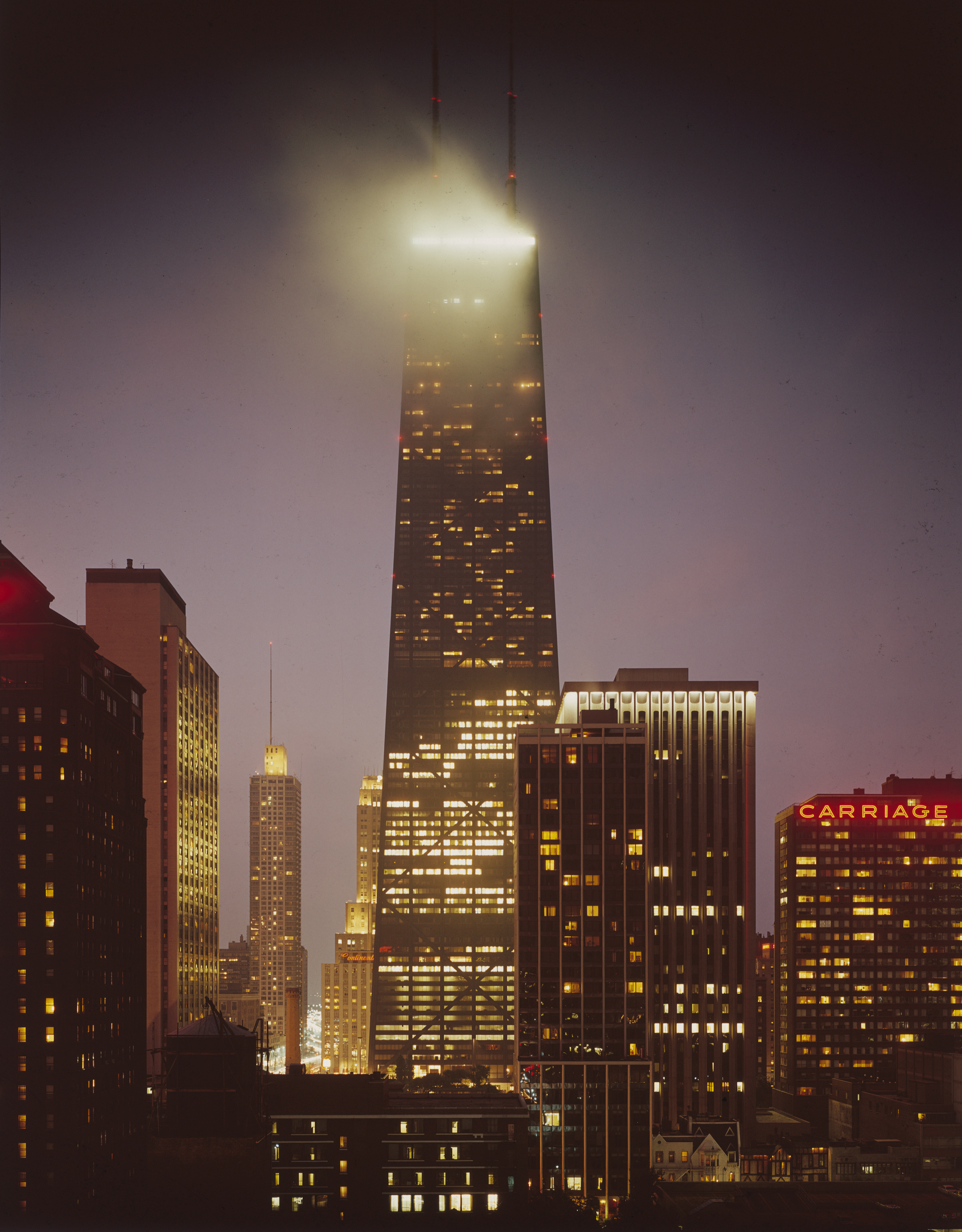
John Hancock Center in 1974

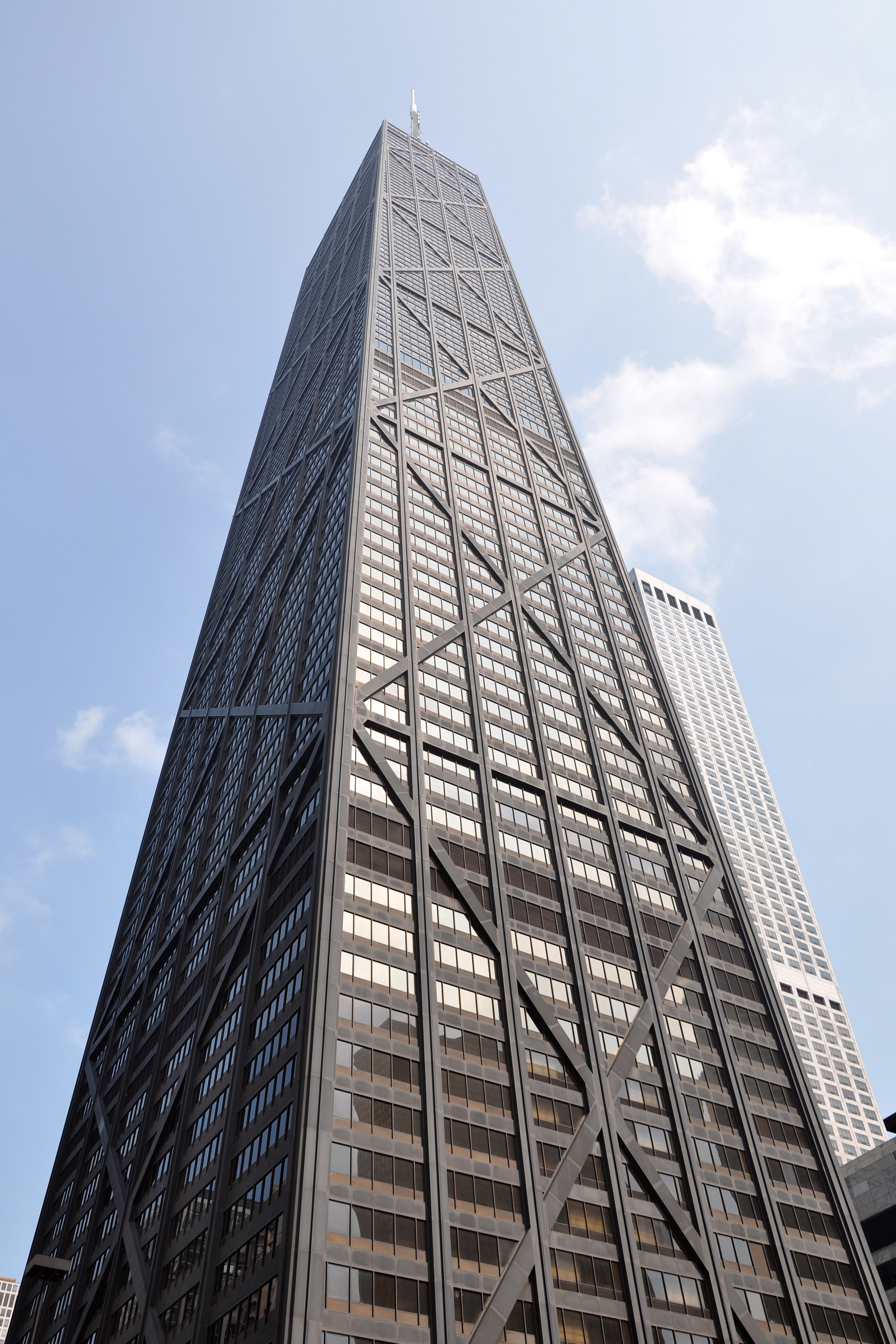
X-bracing on the tower's façade

The building was designed by structural civil engineer Fazlur Khan and chief architect Bruce Graham. One of the most famous buildings of the structural expressionist style, the skyscraper's distinctive X-braced exterior shows that the structure's skin is part of its "tubular system". This is one of the engineering techniques which the designers used to achieve a record height; the tubular system is the structure that keeps the building upright during wind and earthquake loads. This X-bracing allows for both higher performance from tall structures and the ability to open up the inside floorplan. Such original features have allowed 875 North Michigan Avenue to become an architectural icon.

The interior was remodeled in 1995, adding to the lobby travertine, black granite, and textured limestone surfaces. The elliptical-shaped plaza outside the building serves as a public oasis with seasonal plantings and a 12-foot (3.7 m) waterfall. A band of white lights at the top of the building is visible all over Chicago at night, and changes colors for different events. For example, at Christmas time the colors are green and red. When a Chicago-area sports team goes far in the playoffs, the colors are changed to match that team's colors.

The building is a member of the World Federation of Great Towers. It has won various awards for its distinctive style, including the Distinguished Architects Twenty-five Year Award from the American Institute of Architects in May 1999. In celebration of the 2018 Illinois Bicentennial, the John Hancock Center was selected as one of the Illinois 200 Great Places by the American Institute of Architects Illinois component (AIA Illinois) and was recognized by USA Today Travel magazine, as one of AIA Illinois' selections for Illinois 25 Must See Places.

The building is only partially protected by a fire sprinkler system, as the residential floors do not have sprinklers. Including its antennas, the building has a height of 1,500 feet (457 m), making it the thirty-third tallest building in the world when measured to pinnacle height.

== Interior spaces ==
=== 44th floor sky lobby ===
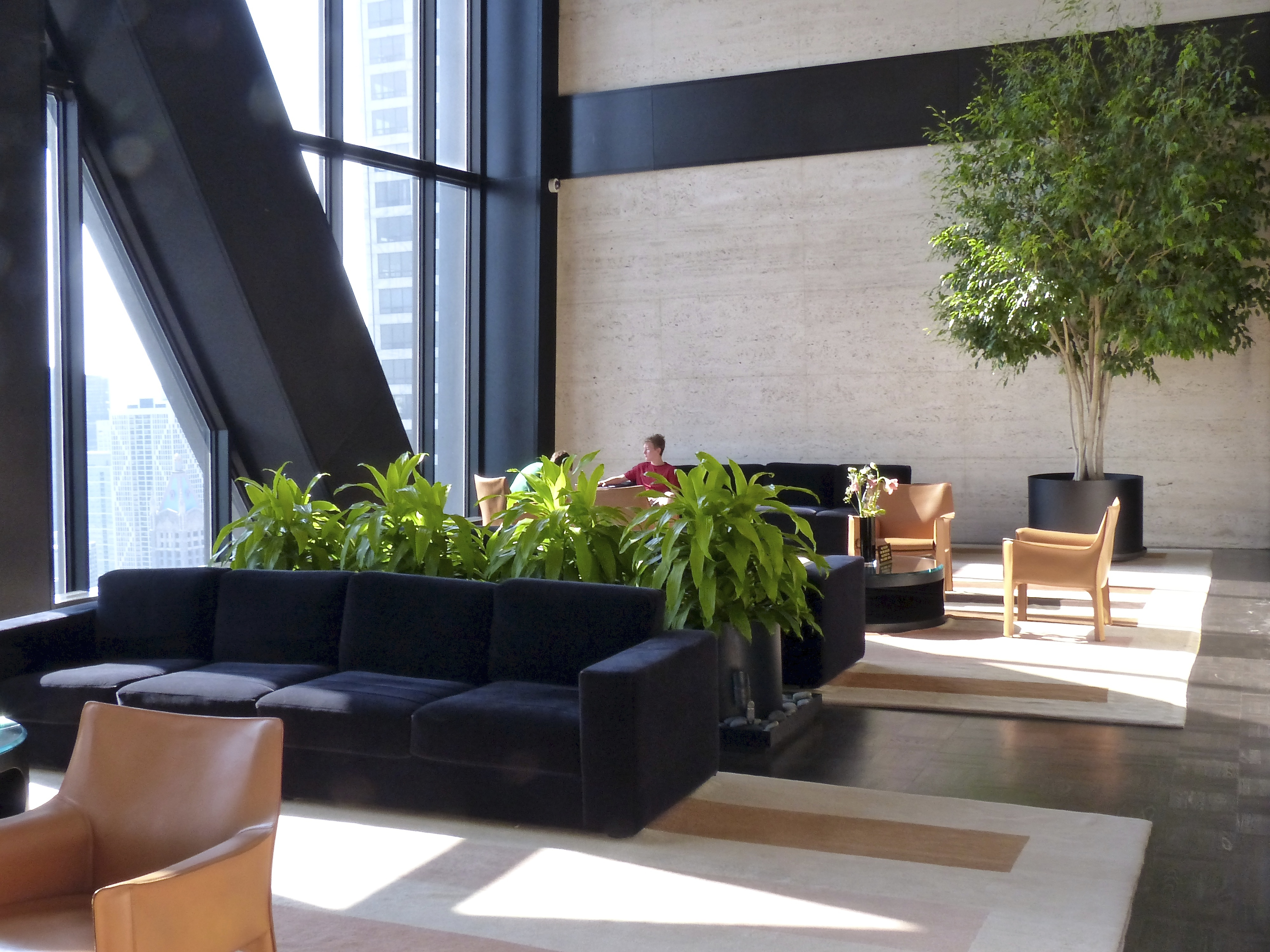
The 44th floor sky lobby in 2013

The 44th level sky lobby is the floor where the building transitions from offices to residential, with offices occupying floors below and residences occupying floors above. The tower was the first in the world to introduce a 'sky lobby' where express elevators from the ground floor stop, and residents then transfer to 'local' elevators to get to their own floor.

==== Swimming pool ====
On its 44th floor, the John Hancock Center has a resident swimming pool. The pool area has double-height ceilings.

The pool is the highest pool in the United States when measured by distance above ground level.

Images of the swimming pool
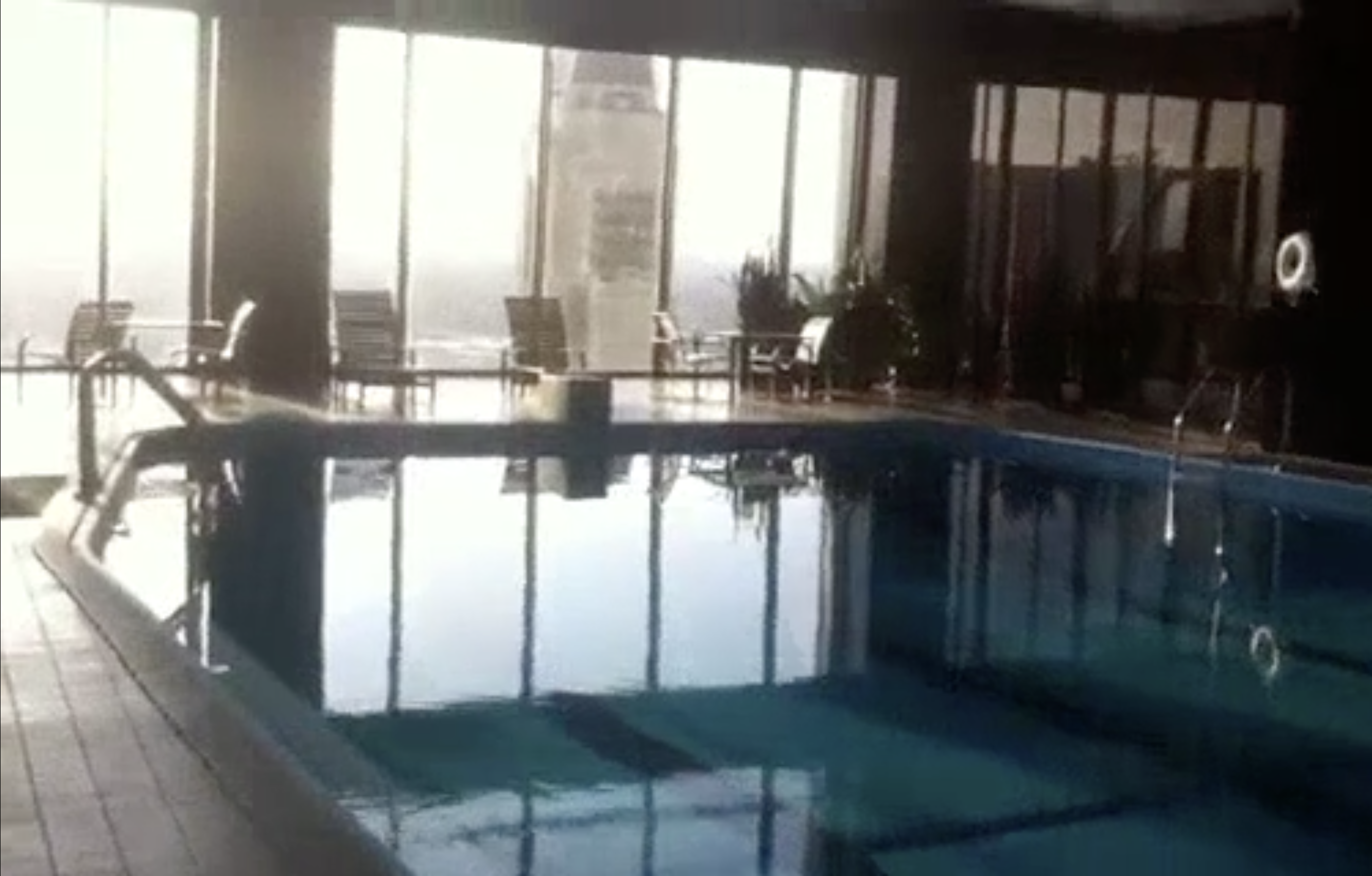
Pool, captured in 2011

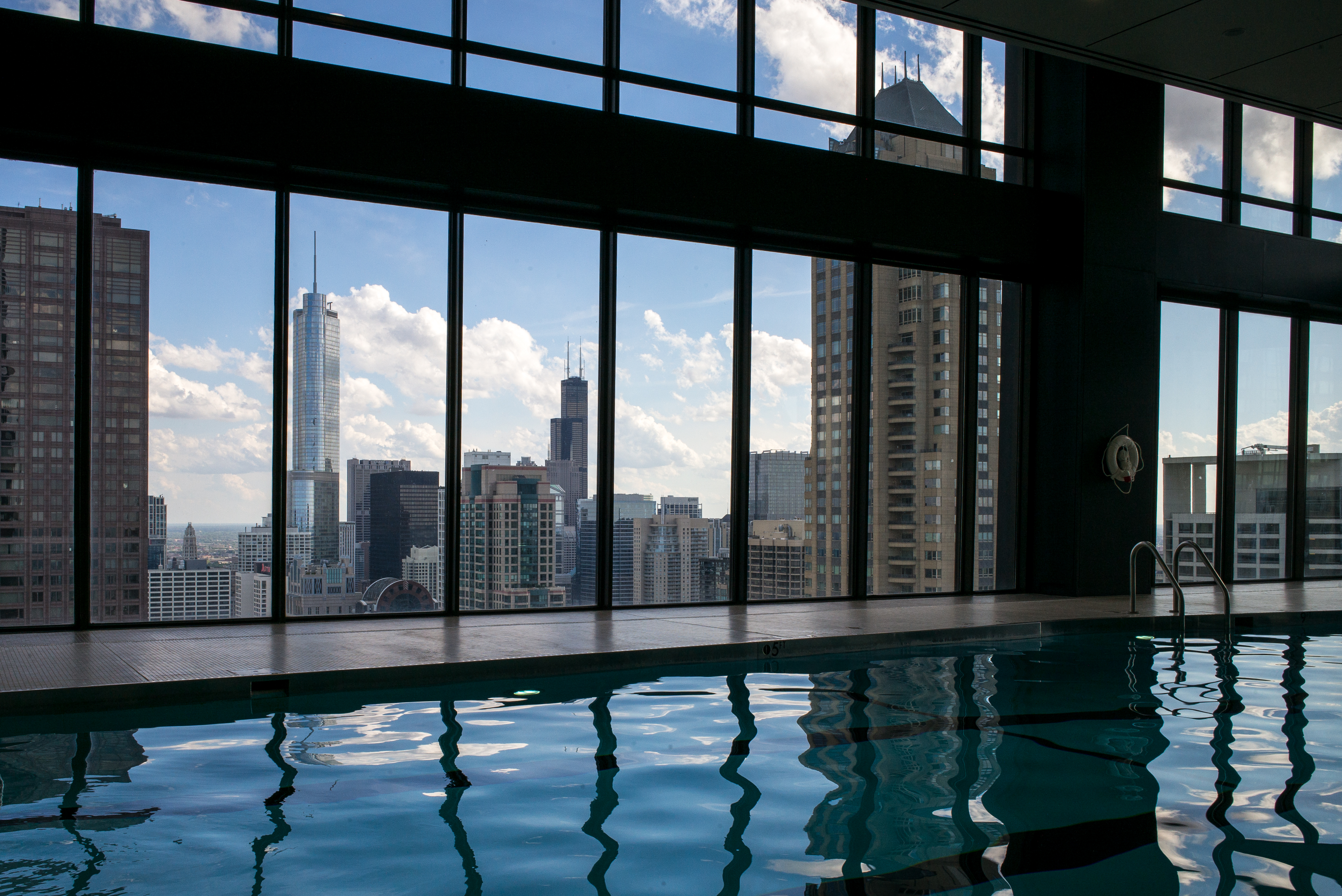
Pool and its south-facing view of the city, photographed in 2016

==== Resident/office tenant grocery store ====
On its 44th floor, the building has a 5,200 square feet (480 m^{2}) grocery store accessible only to apartment residents and office tenants. In 2007, operation of the grocery store was taken over by the local Potash chain of grocery stores. As of February 2023, Potash continues to operate the grocery store.

=== Upper floors ===
==== Express elevators ====
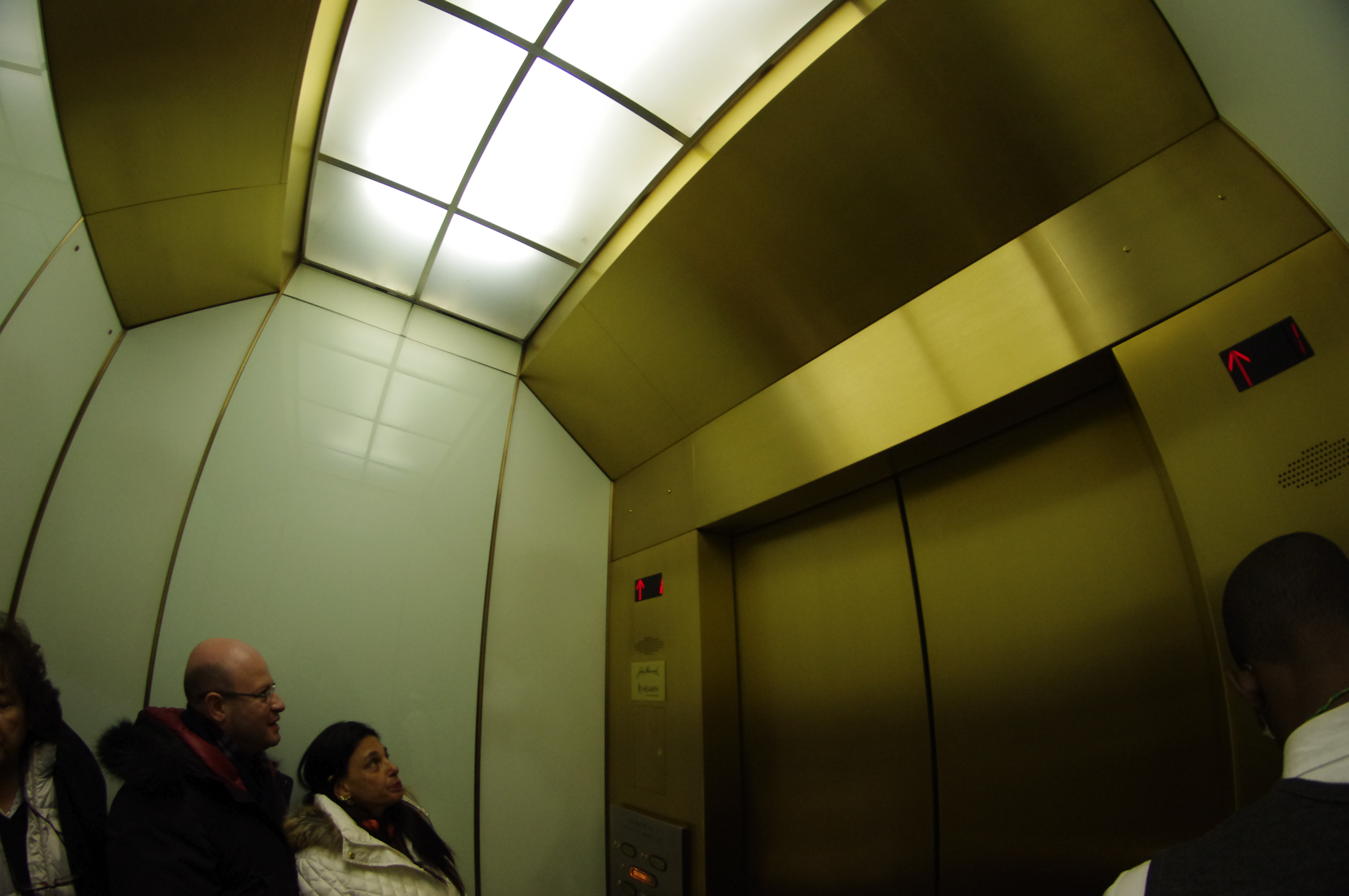
The interior of one of the Otis Elevator Company-manufactured express elevators that serving the 94th floor observation deck, 95th floor restaurant, and 96th floor cocktail lounge

The elevators that serve the top three public floors are credited as the fastest in both North America and the Western Hemisphere. Manufactured by Otis, the elevators travel 96 floors at a top speed of 1,800 ft/min (20 mph; 9.1 m/s). It has been said that they would be capable of reaching the 95th floor in 38 seconds if they could run the entire trip at their top speed.

==== 360 Chicago Observation Deck ====
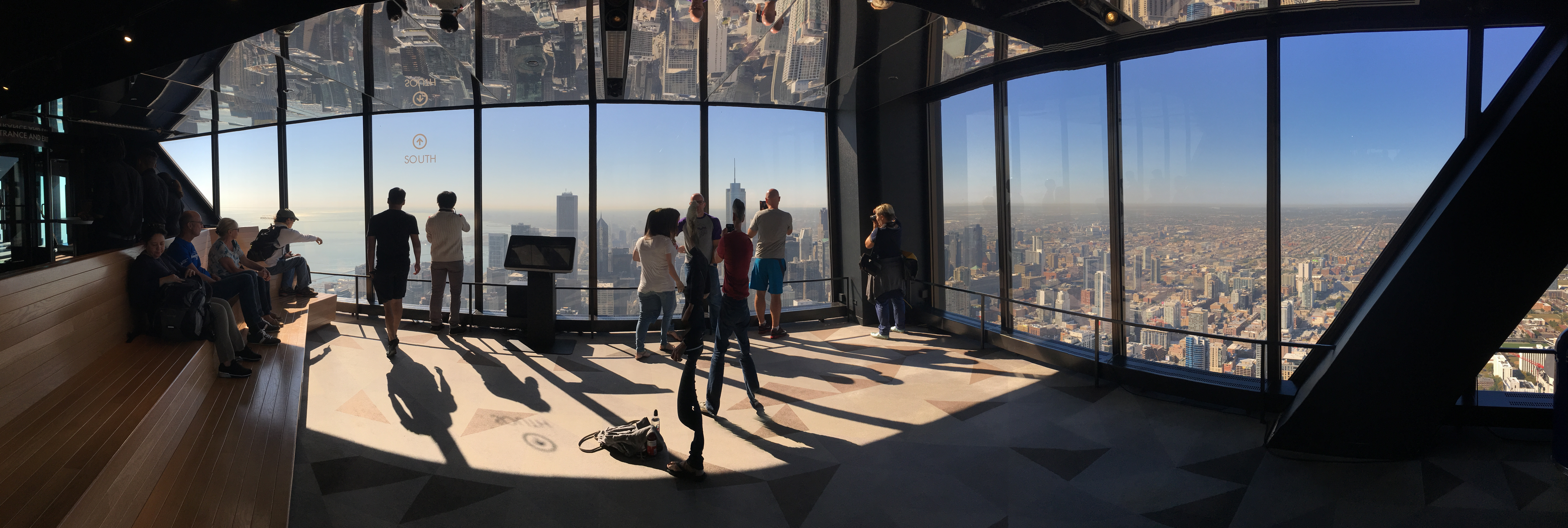
Panoramic photograph showing the southeast interior corner of the observation deck in 2017

Located on the 94th floor, 360 Chicago Observation Deck is 875 North Michigan Avenue's horizon observatory. The floor of the observatory is 1,030 feet (310 m) above the street-level below. The entrance can be found on the concourse level of 875 North Michigan Avenue, accessible from the Michigan Avenue side of the building. The observatory was previously named "John Hancock Observatory". It has been independently owned and operated since 2014 as an subsidiary of the Paris, France-based observation deck company Magnicity (formerly known as the "Montparnasse 56 Group"). After its acquisition of the observation deck, the company extensively renovated the space in 2014.

The observatory boasts more floor space than its direct competitor, Skydeck at the Willis Tower. The observation deck currently includes a cocktail lounge named the "CloudBar". After the closure of the building's 96th floor cocktail lounge, 360 CHICAGO has advertised it as being the highest cocktail lounge in the city. It was formerly named "BAR 94". In the summer of 2014, 360 Chicago added its TILT attraction. TILT, which requires an additional fee to experience, features a series of floor-to-ceiling windows that slowly tilt outside the building to 30°. The observation deck also features an open-air "SkyWalk" area with wire mesh in lieu of glass windows.

For several years in the 2010s, during its winter season, the observation deck would feature the "world's highest skating rink", with an artificial ice rink being seasonally installed. At one point, observation deck had a mascot named Seemore Miles.

General images of the 360 Chicago Observation Deck
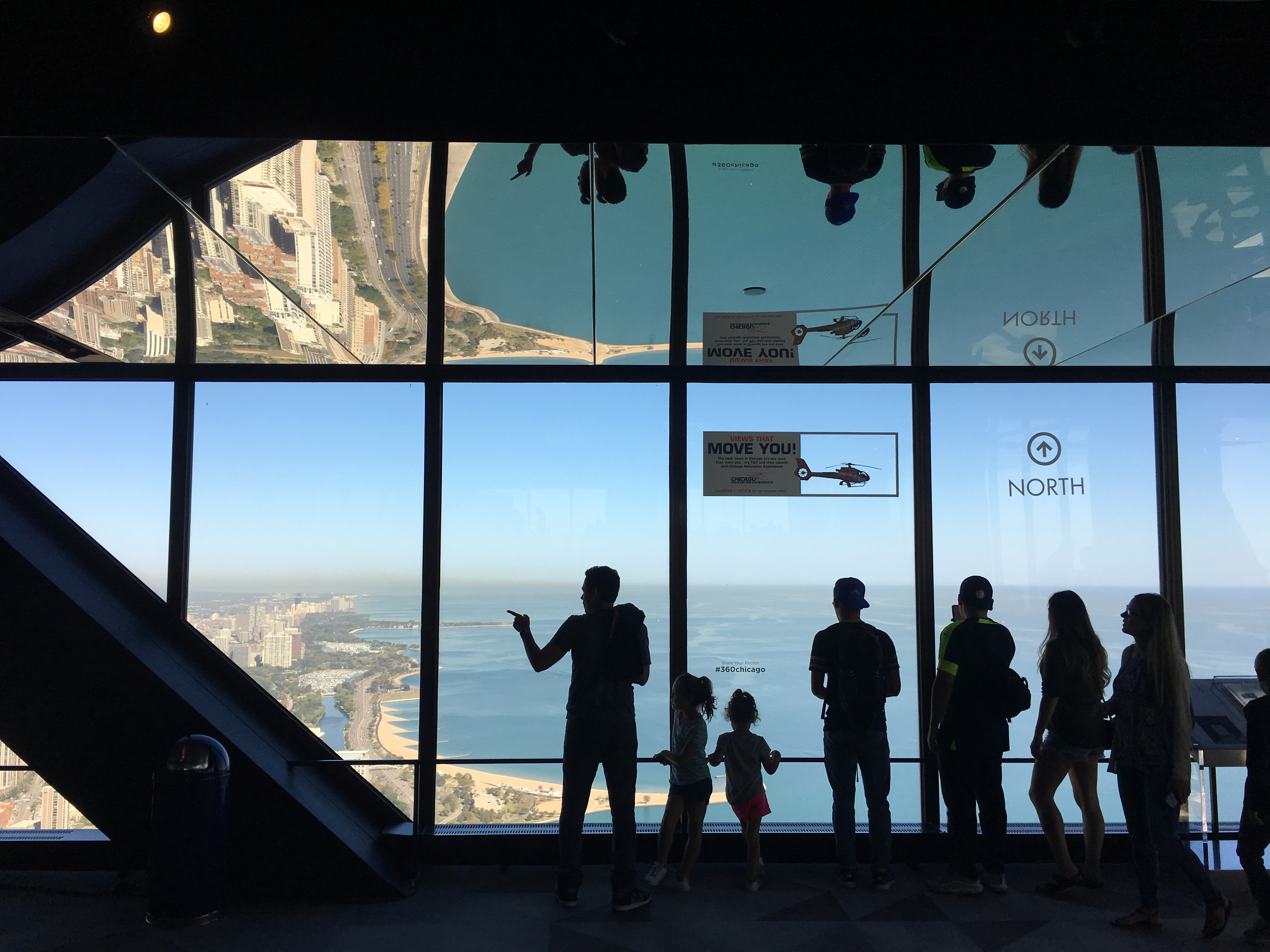
Tourists enjoy north-facing observation deck views in 2017

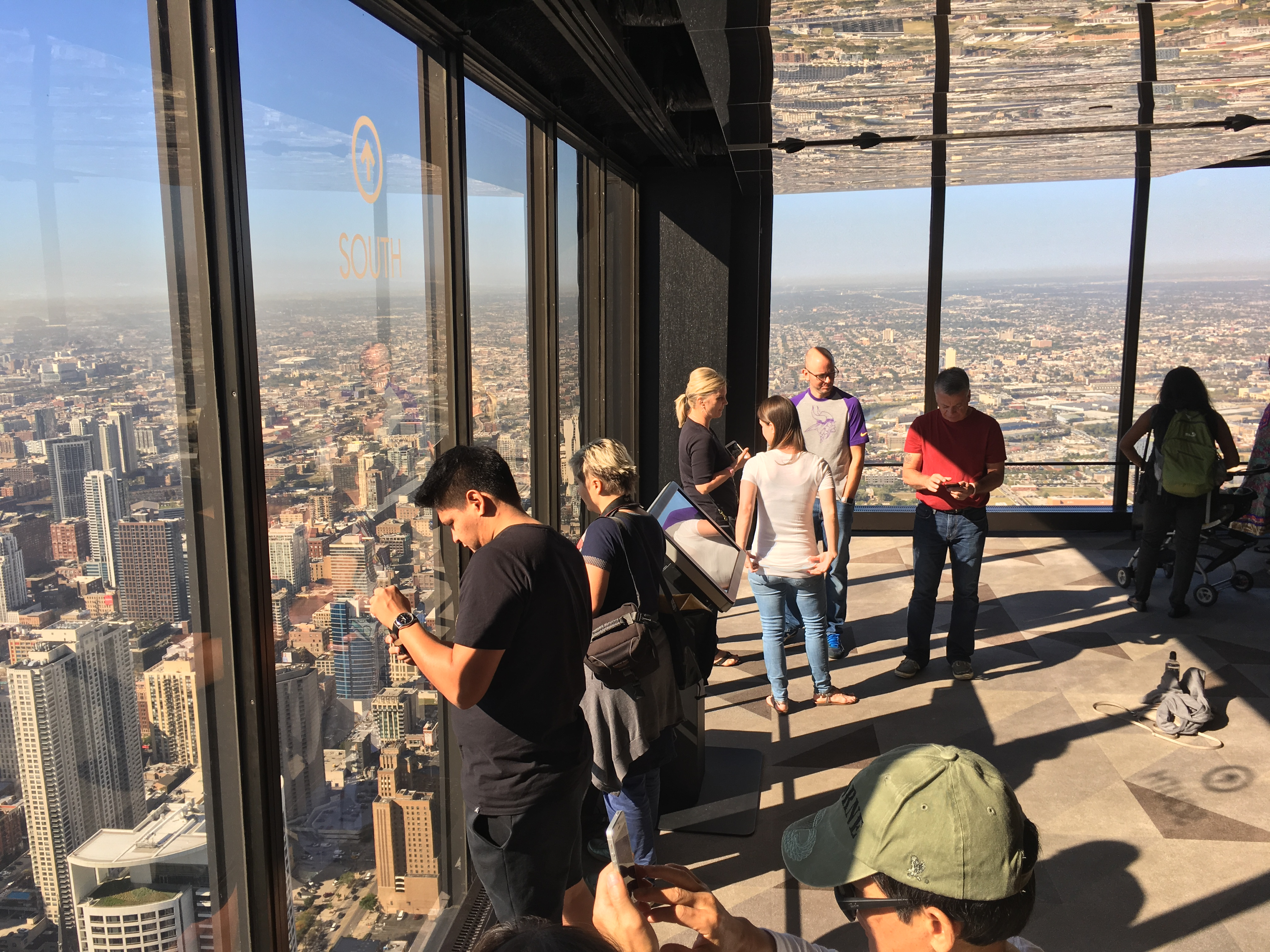
Tourists enjoy views at the southwest corner of the observation deck in 2017

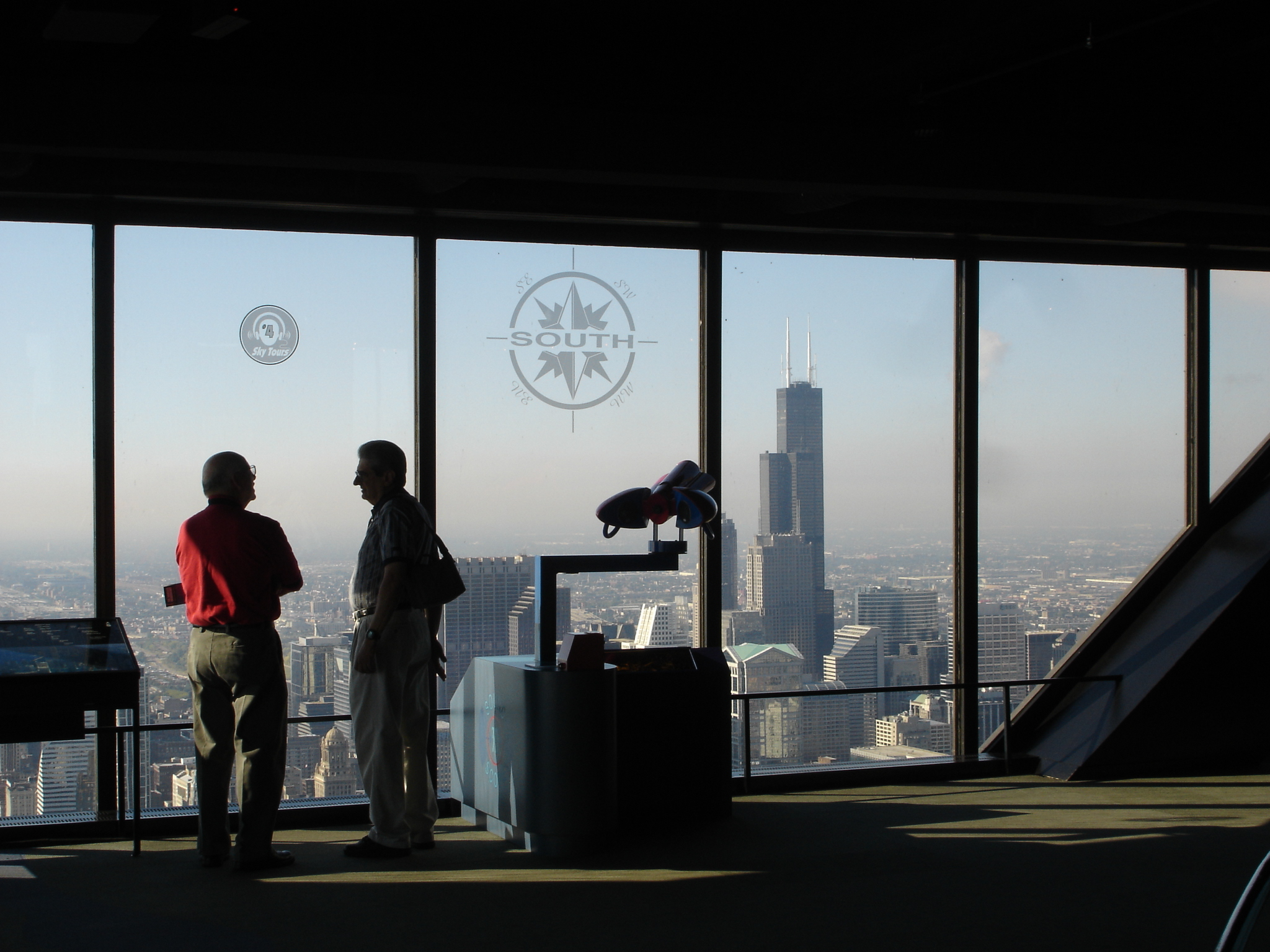
Tourists enjoy south-facing views in 2005

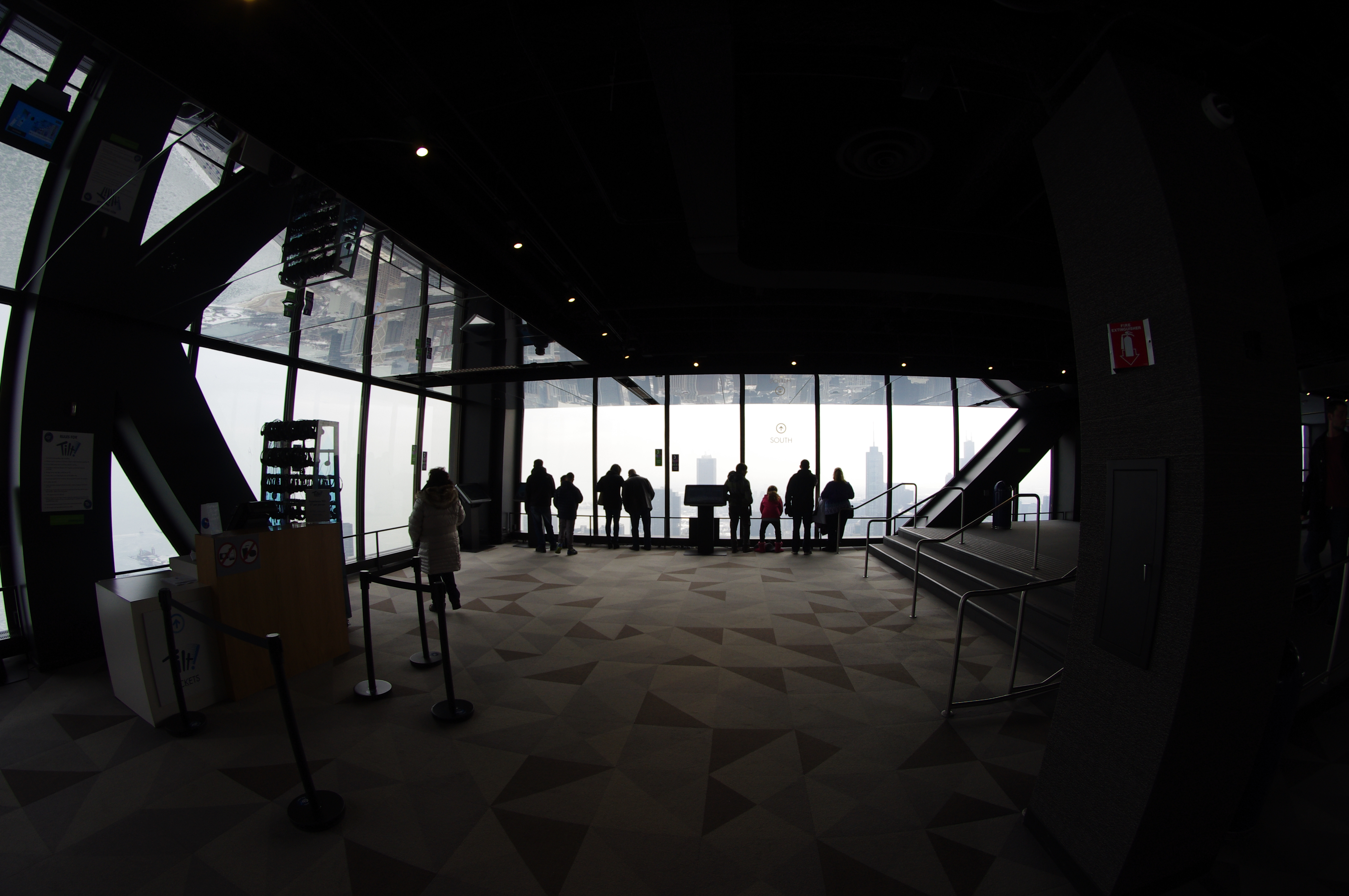
Southeast corner of the observation deck in 2015

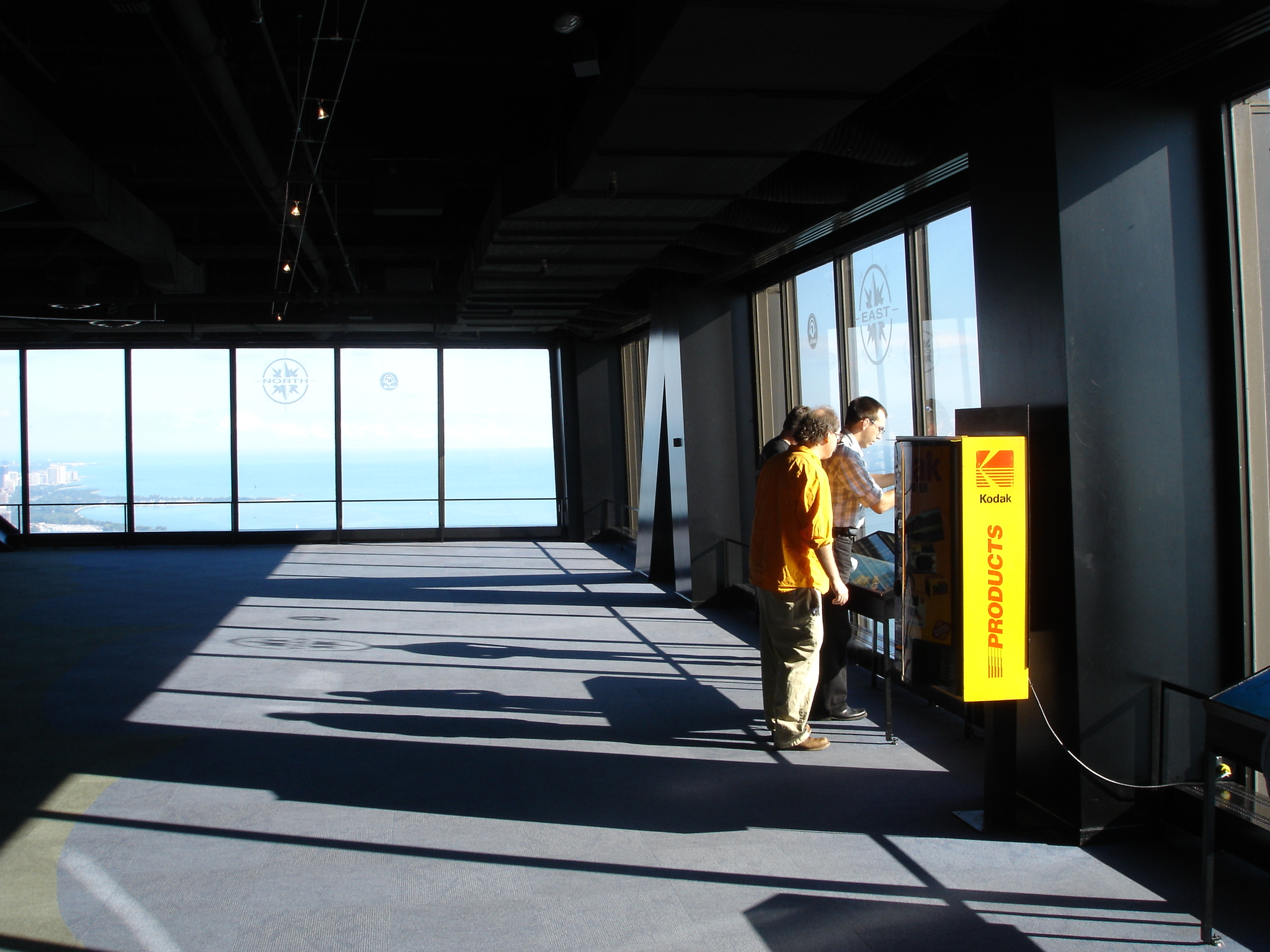
Northeast corner of the observation deck in 2005

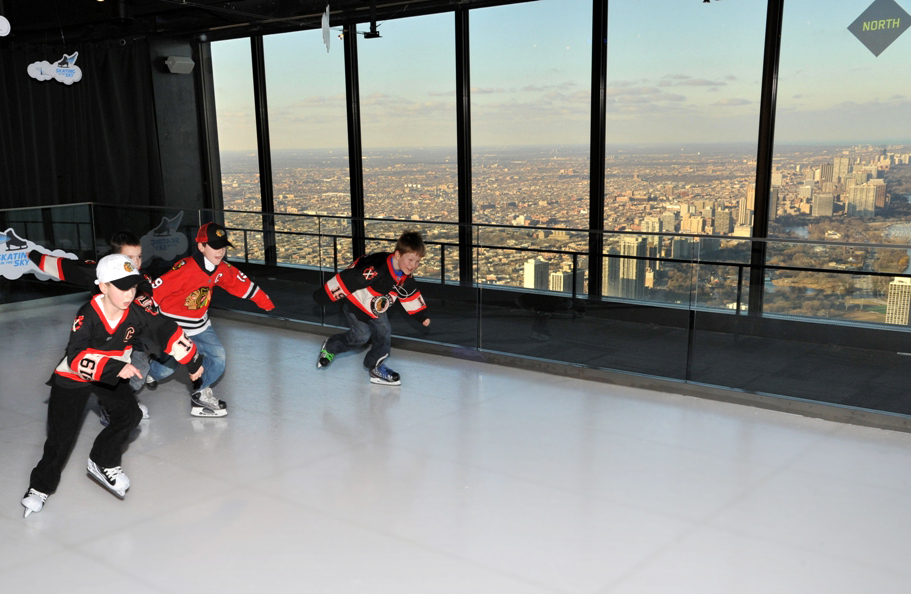
Children skate on an artificial ice rink erected on along the north-facing end of the observation deck in late-2011

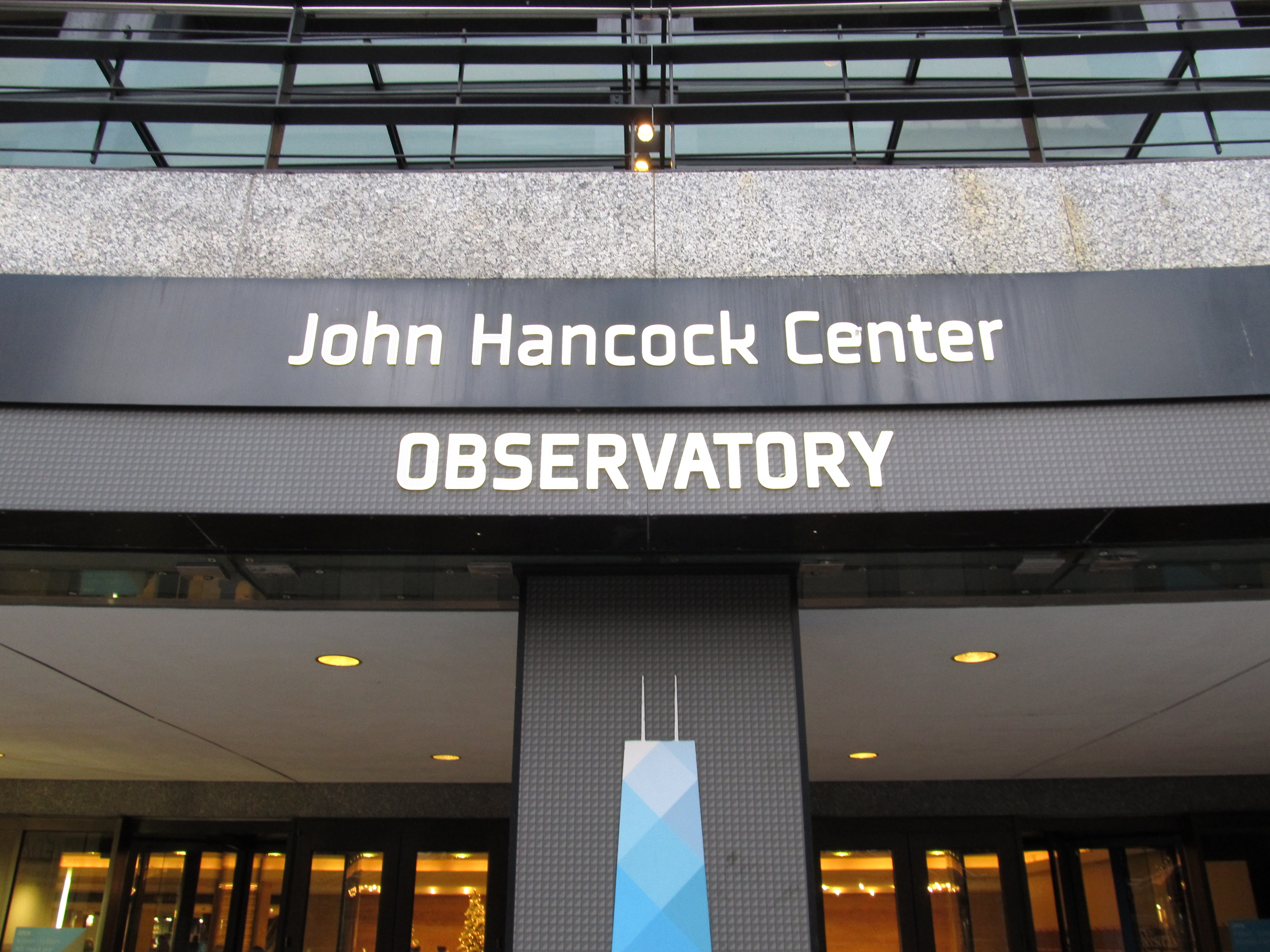
Plaza-level entrance to the observatory photographed in 2013 (when it was known as the "John Hancock Center Observatory")

Images of the TILT Thrill Ride
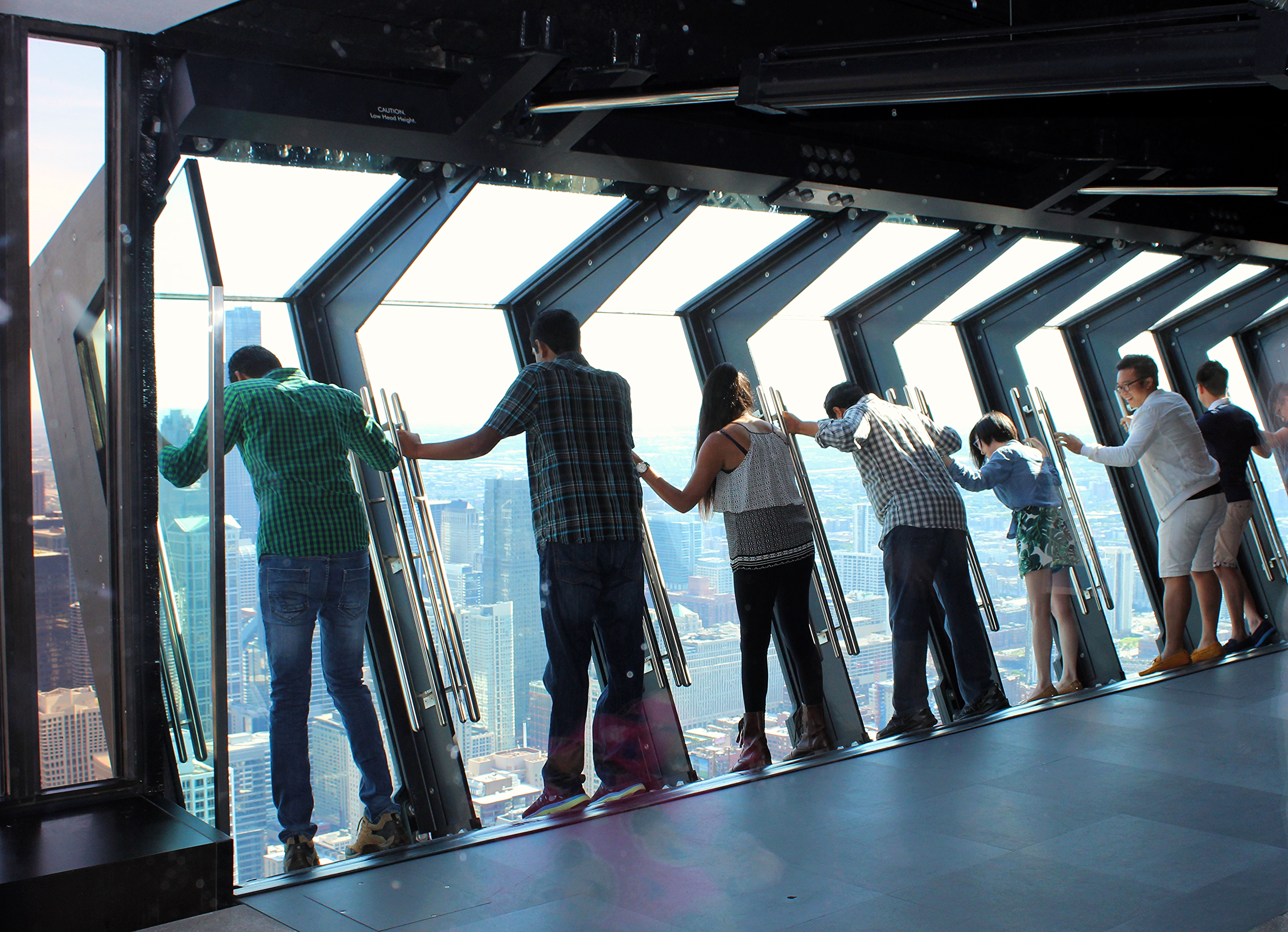
2014 daytime interior view of tourists on the TILT Thrill Ride, with the attraction in its outward-leaning position

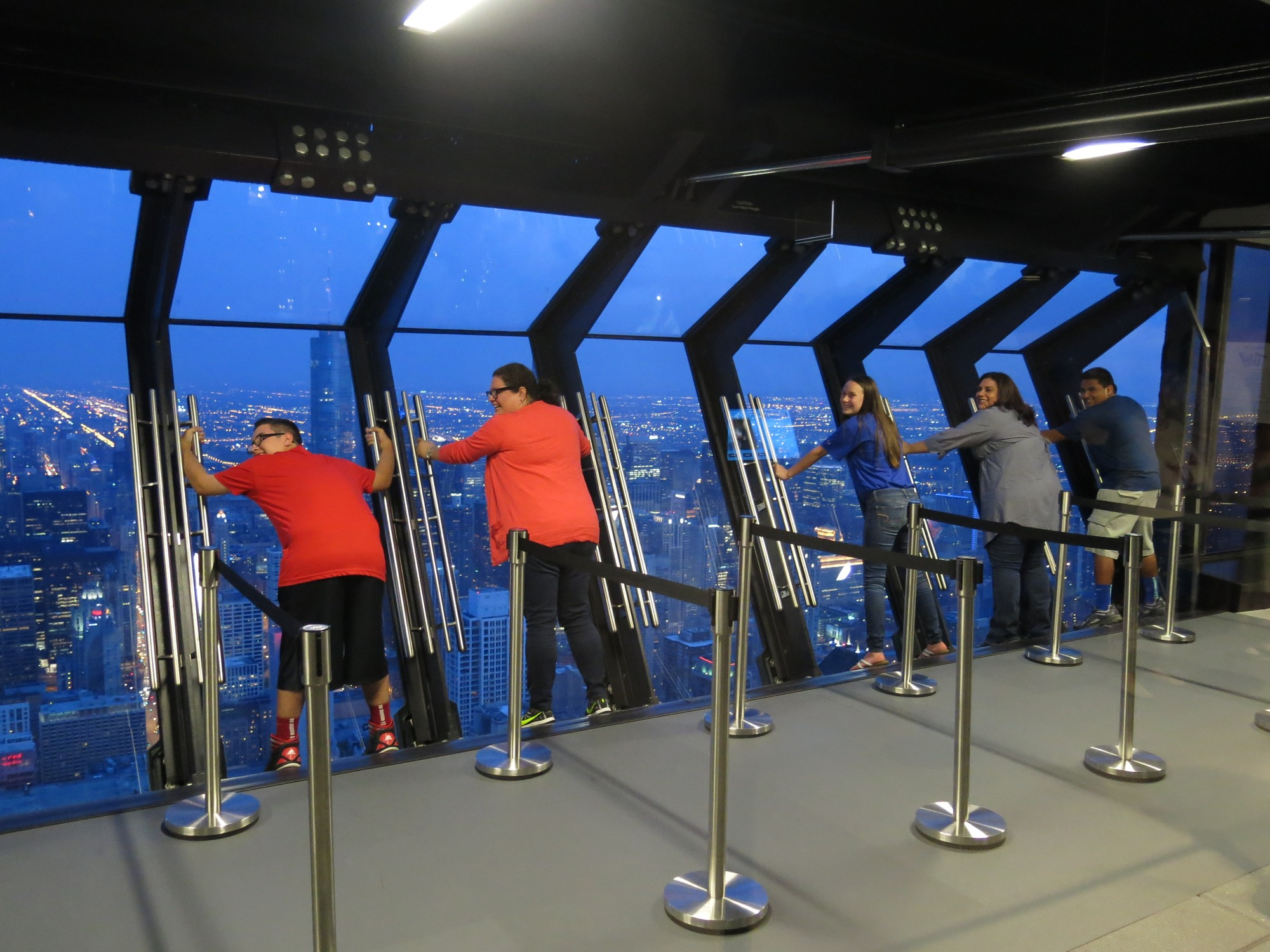
2014 dusk interior view of tourists on the TILT Thrill Ride, with the attraction in its outward-leaning position

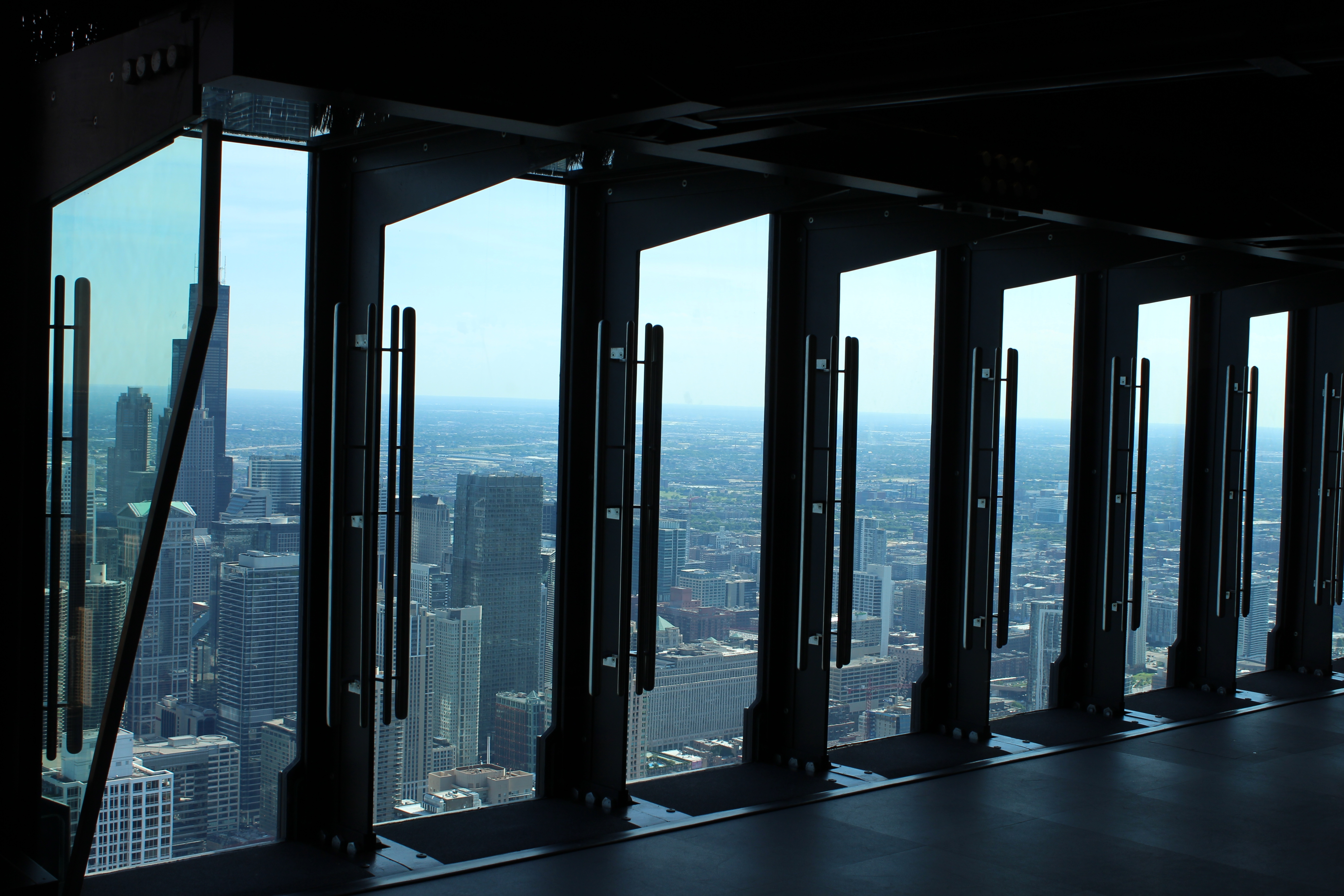
2014 interior view of the TILT Thrill Ride in its non-tilted position

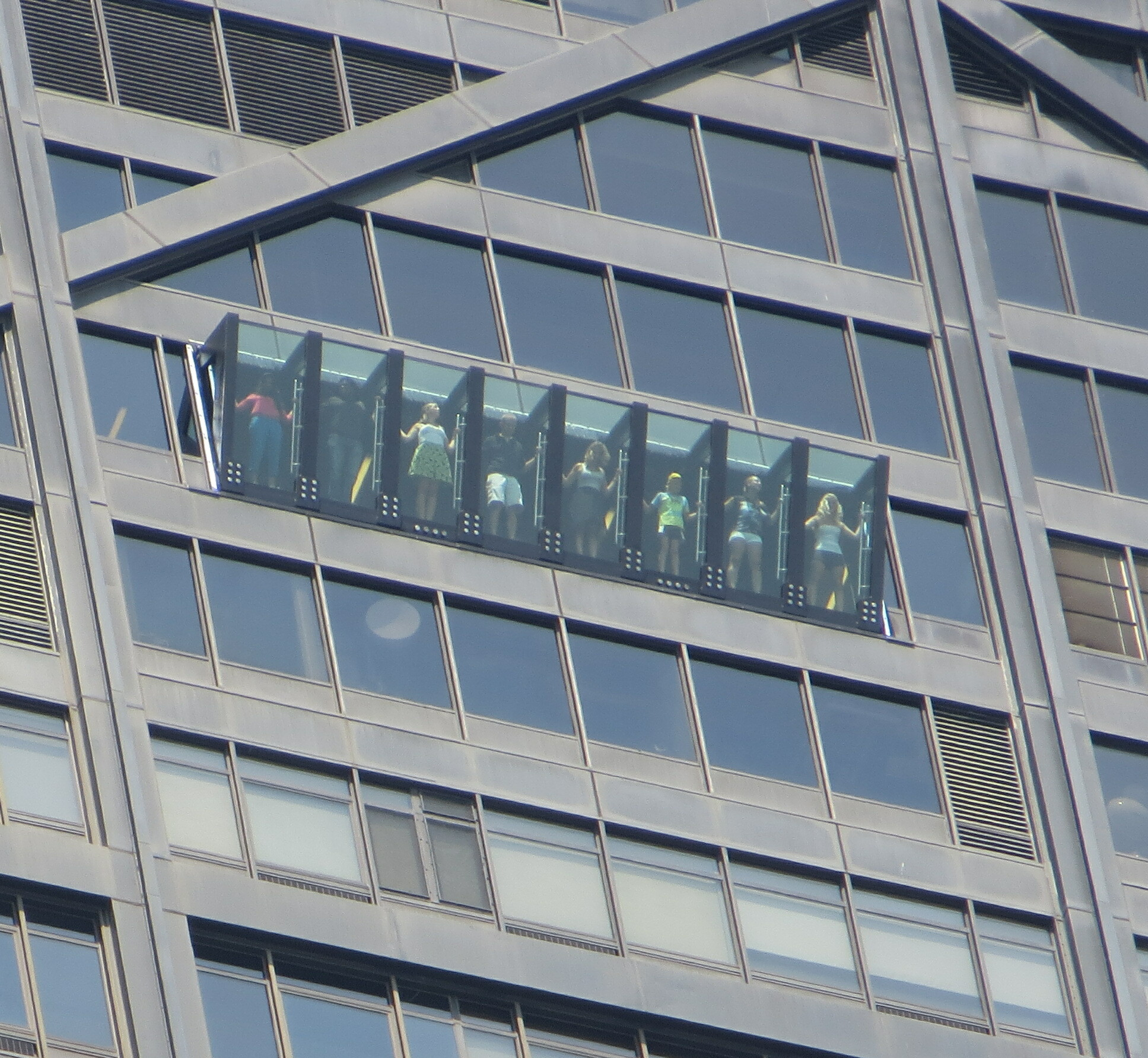
Exterior view showing tourists on the TILT Thrill Ride in 2014

Images of the SkyWalk
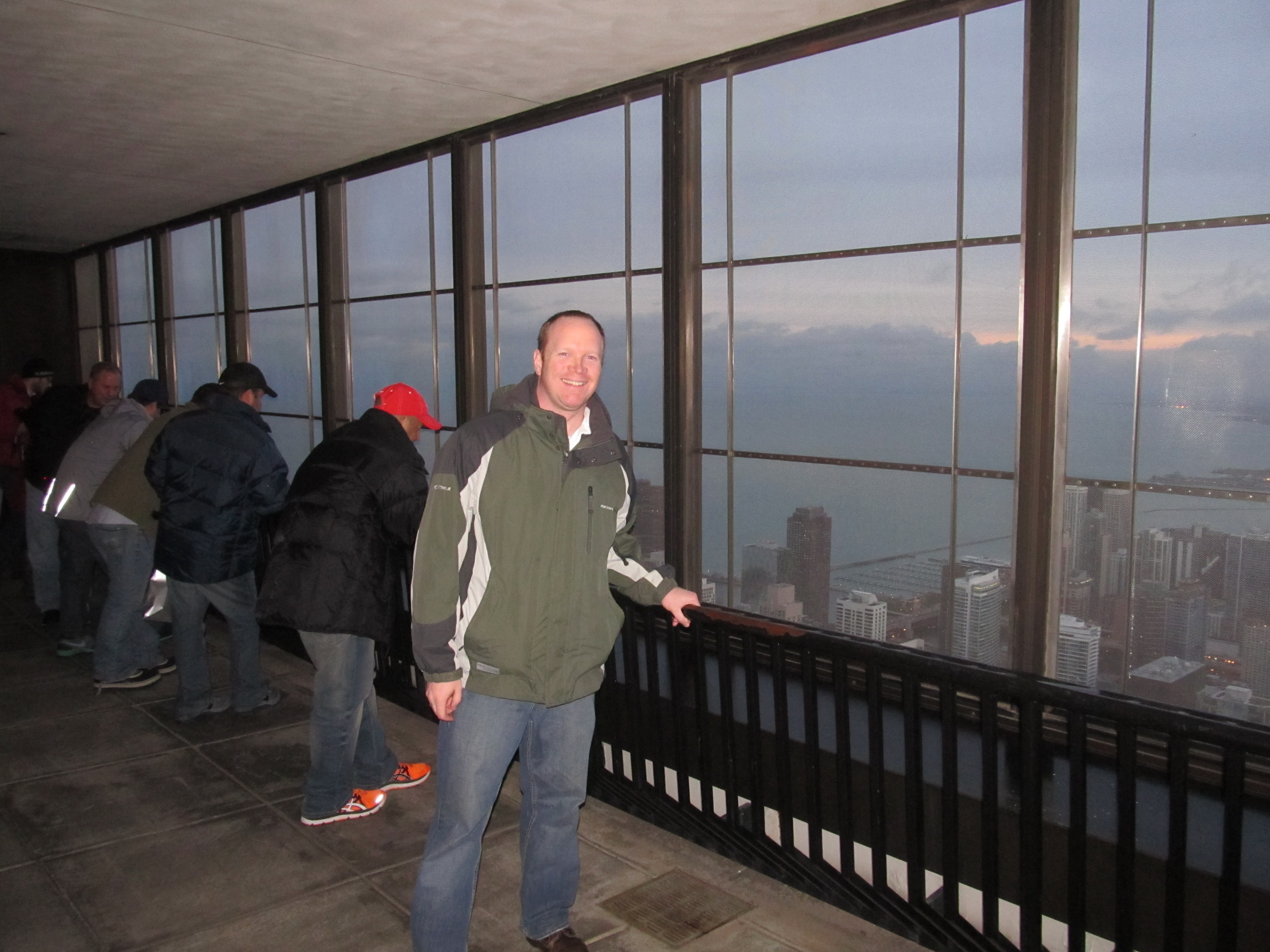
Tourists in the observation deck's screen-protected open-air SkyWalk area in 2013

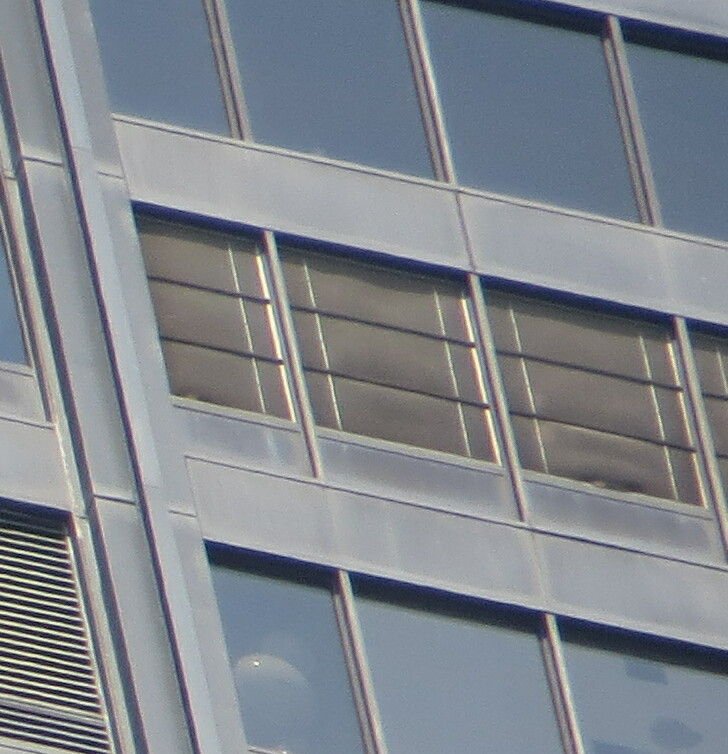
Exterior view of the SkyWalk area in 2014

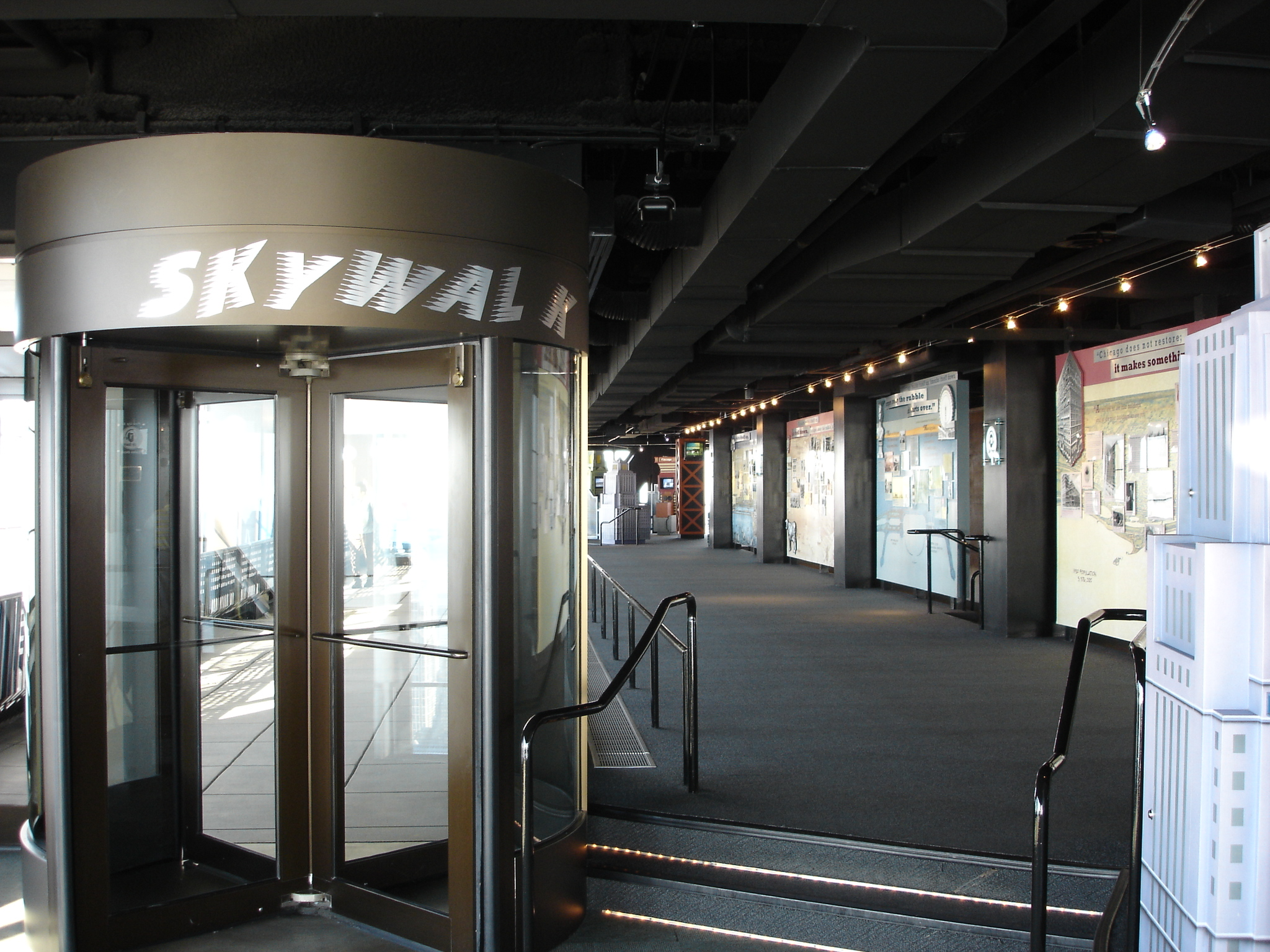
Entrance to the open-air SkyWalk in 2005

==== Former 95th floor restaurant and 96th floor cocktail lounge ====
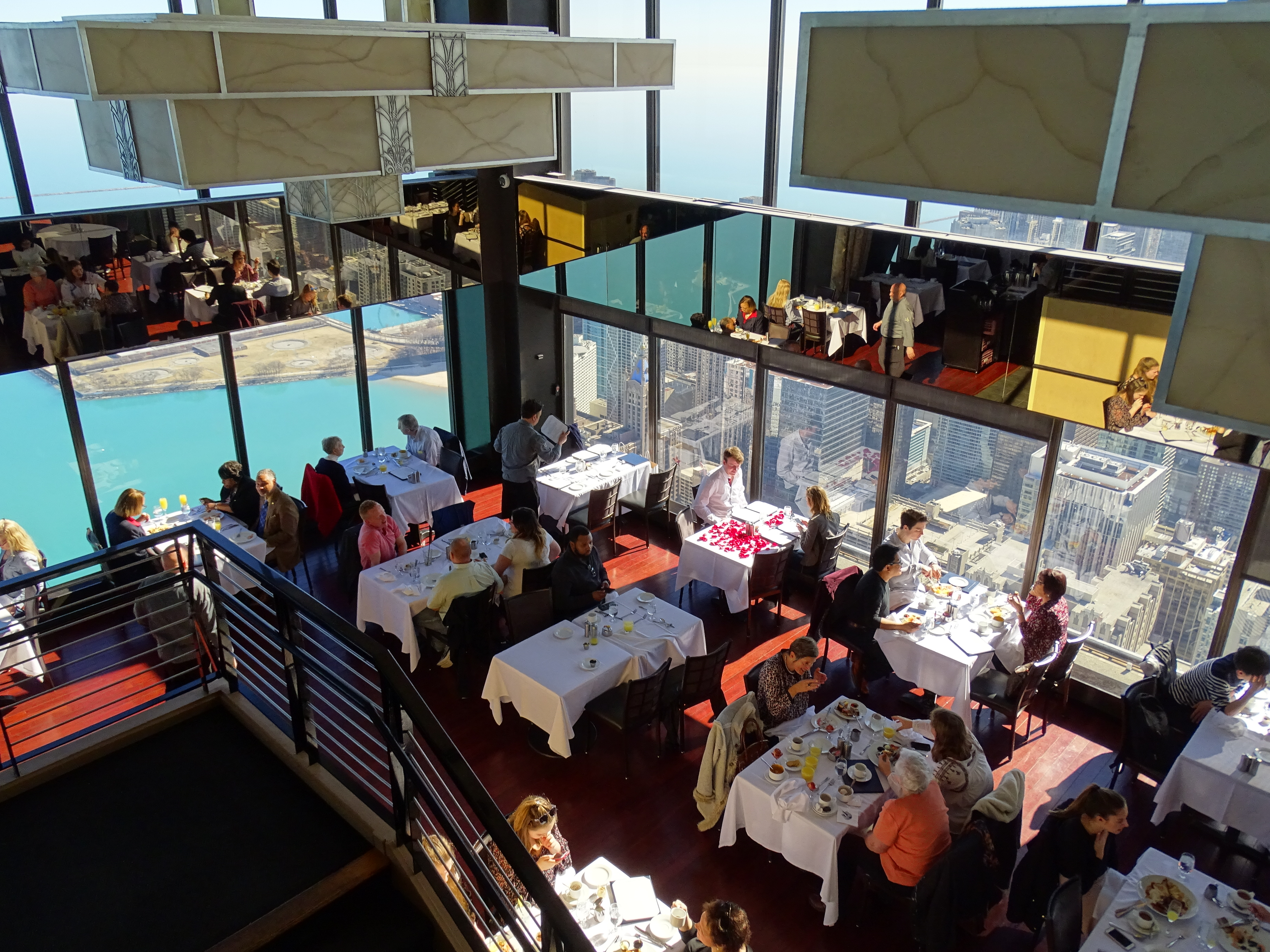
Southeast corner of the Signature Room in 2017

Separate from its observatory, 875 Michigan Avenue formerly had a restaurant space on its 95th floor and a cocktail lounge space on its 96th floor. The combined space on these floors was approximately 30,000 square feet (2,800 m^{2}). The original restaurant in this space was named "The 95th restaurant", which operated from the 1970s until 1993. Its accompanying 96th floor cocktail lounge was named "Images". From 1993 until 2023, the 95th floor was home to a restaurant named the "Signature Room", with the accompanying cocktail lounge on the 96th floor being named the "Signature Lounge". The name alluded to the famous signature of early American figure John Hancock. The restaurant was an upscale establishment that offered patrons scenic views. It enforced a dress code for patrons. It received numerous awards. In September 2023, the Signature Room abruptly ceased operations due to "severe economic hardships" caused by the COVID-19 pandemic.

Images of the Signature Room
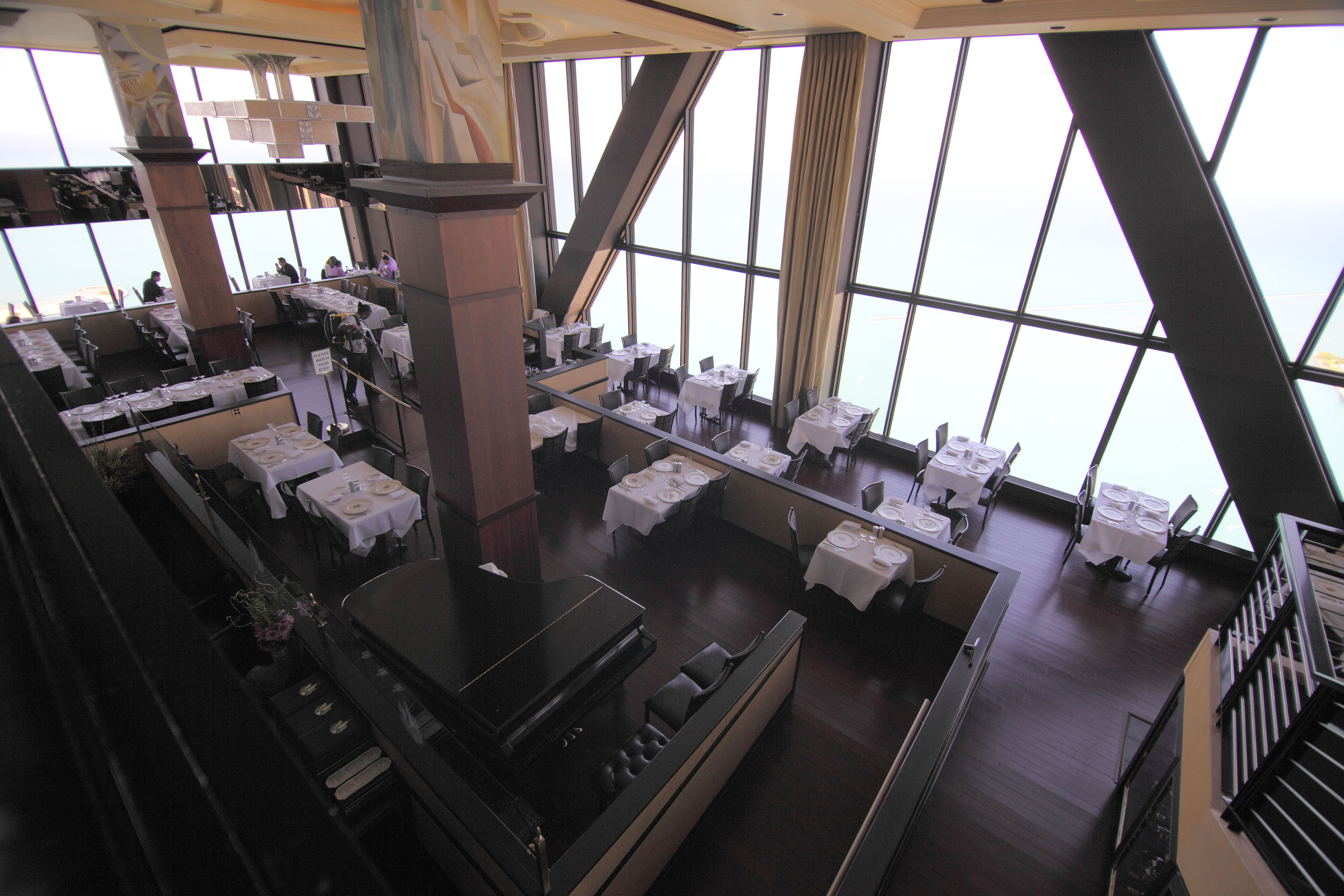
Northeast corner of the Signature Room in 2014

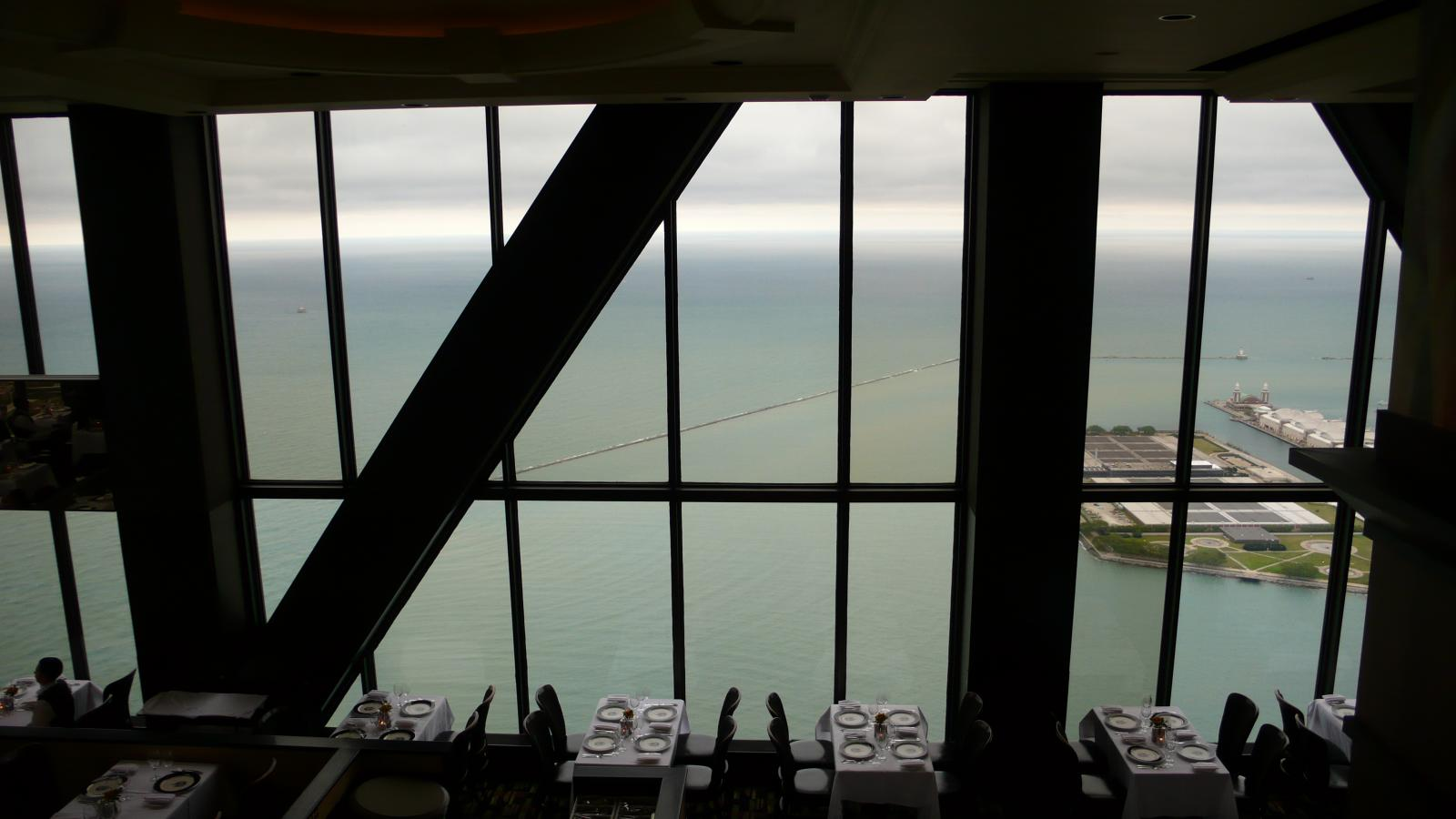
East-facing view of The Signature Room in 2008

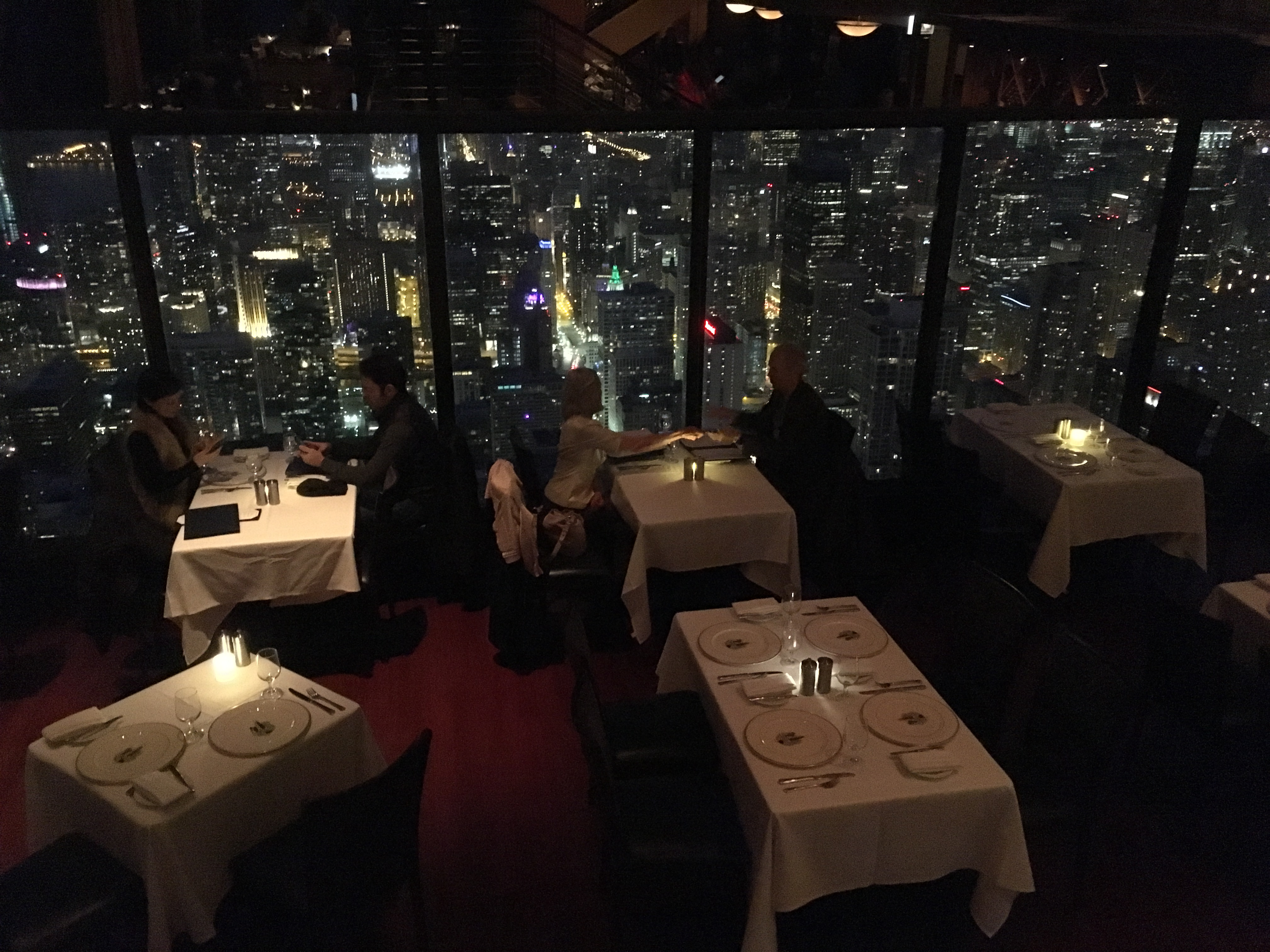
South-facing view showing patrons dining in The Signature Room at night in 2018

Images of the Signature Lounge
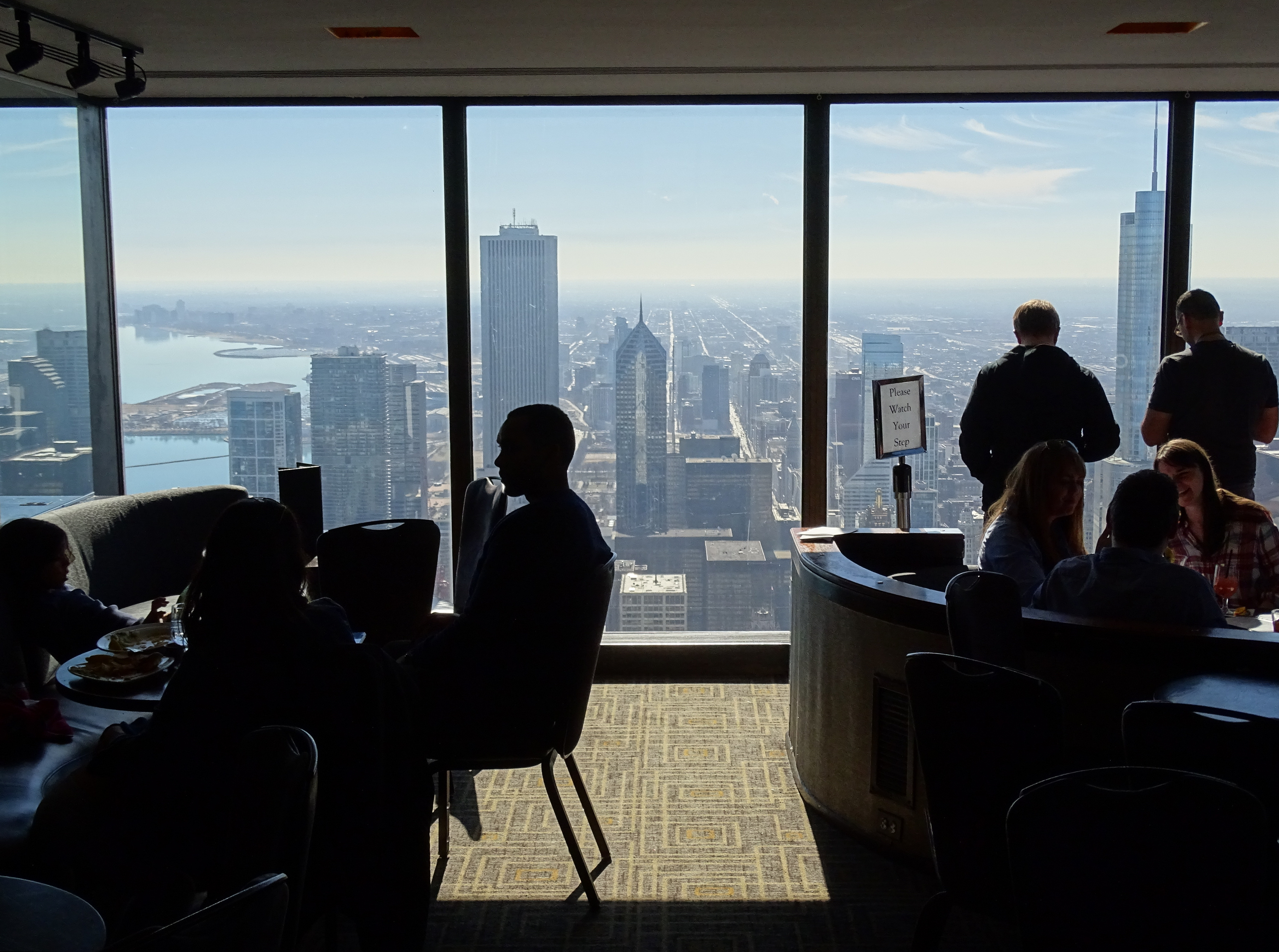
The Signature Lounge facing south in 2017

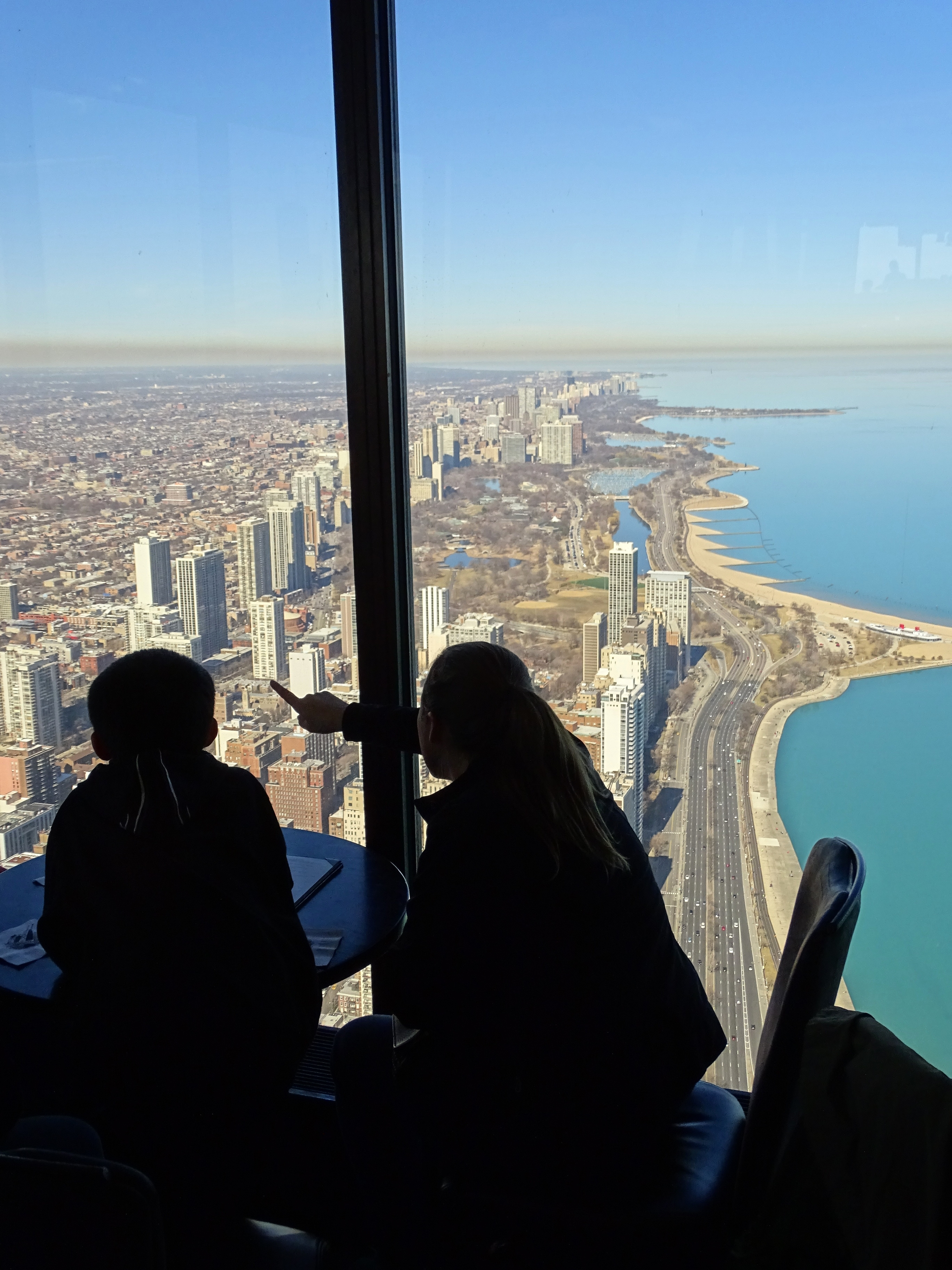
Patrons of Signature Lounge enjoying north-facing views in 2017

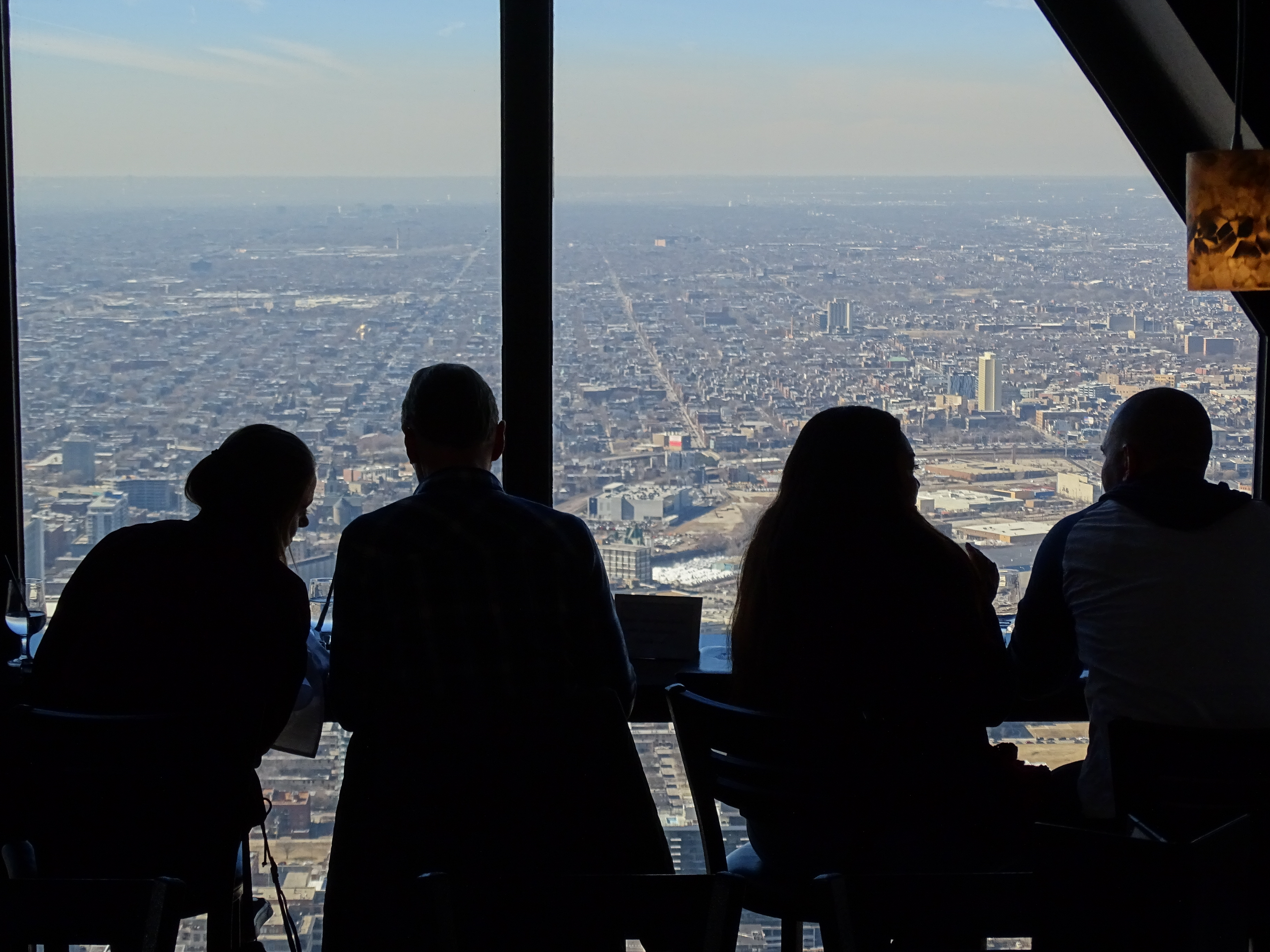
Patrons of The Signature Lounge enjoy west facing views in 2017

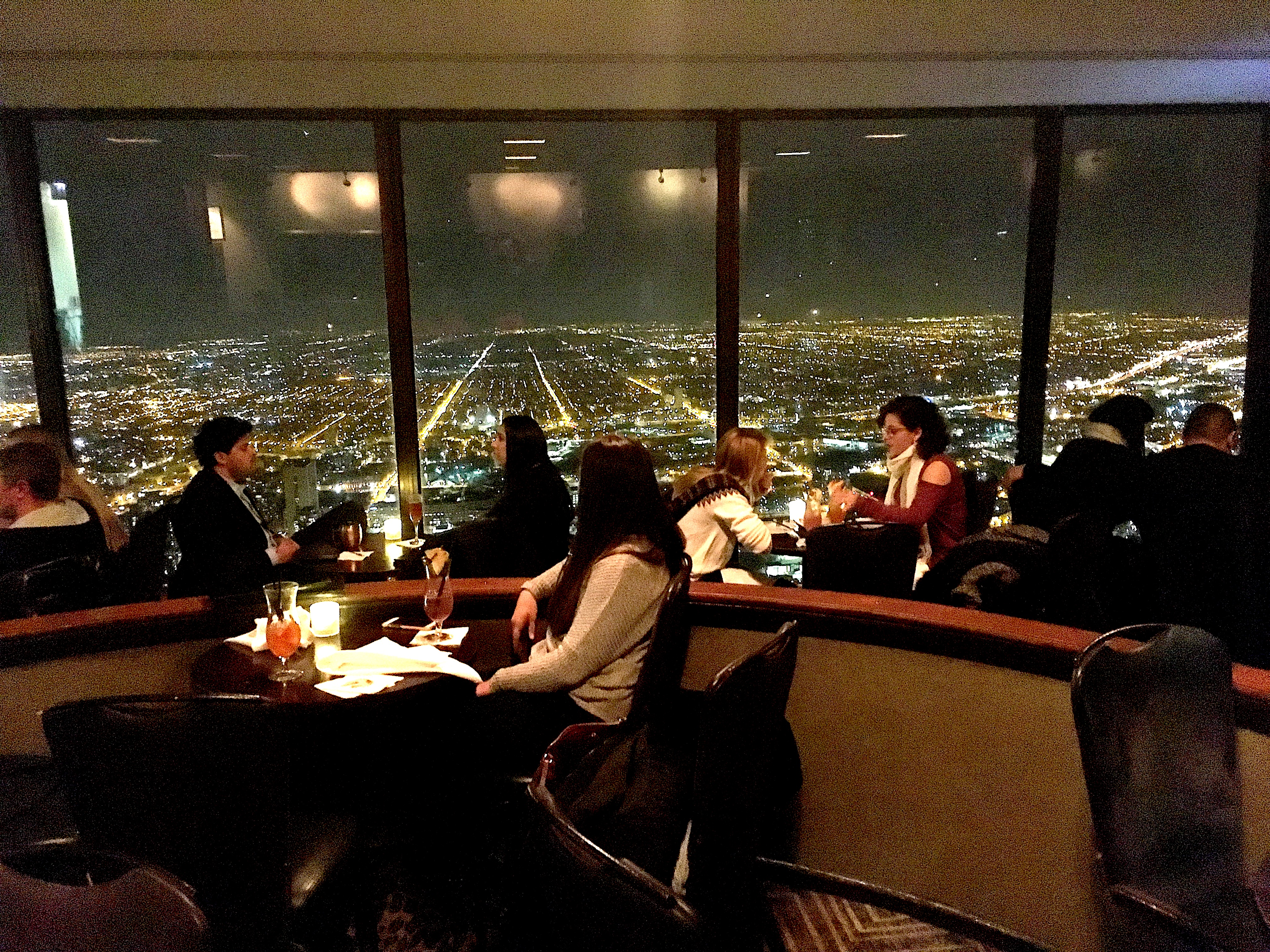
The Signature Lounge facing west at night in 2018

=== Parking garage ===
Housed within several of the lower levels of the building is a parking garage, which cars enter and depart via a spiral vehicle ramp.

Images of the parking garage
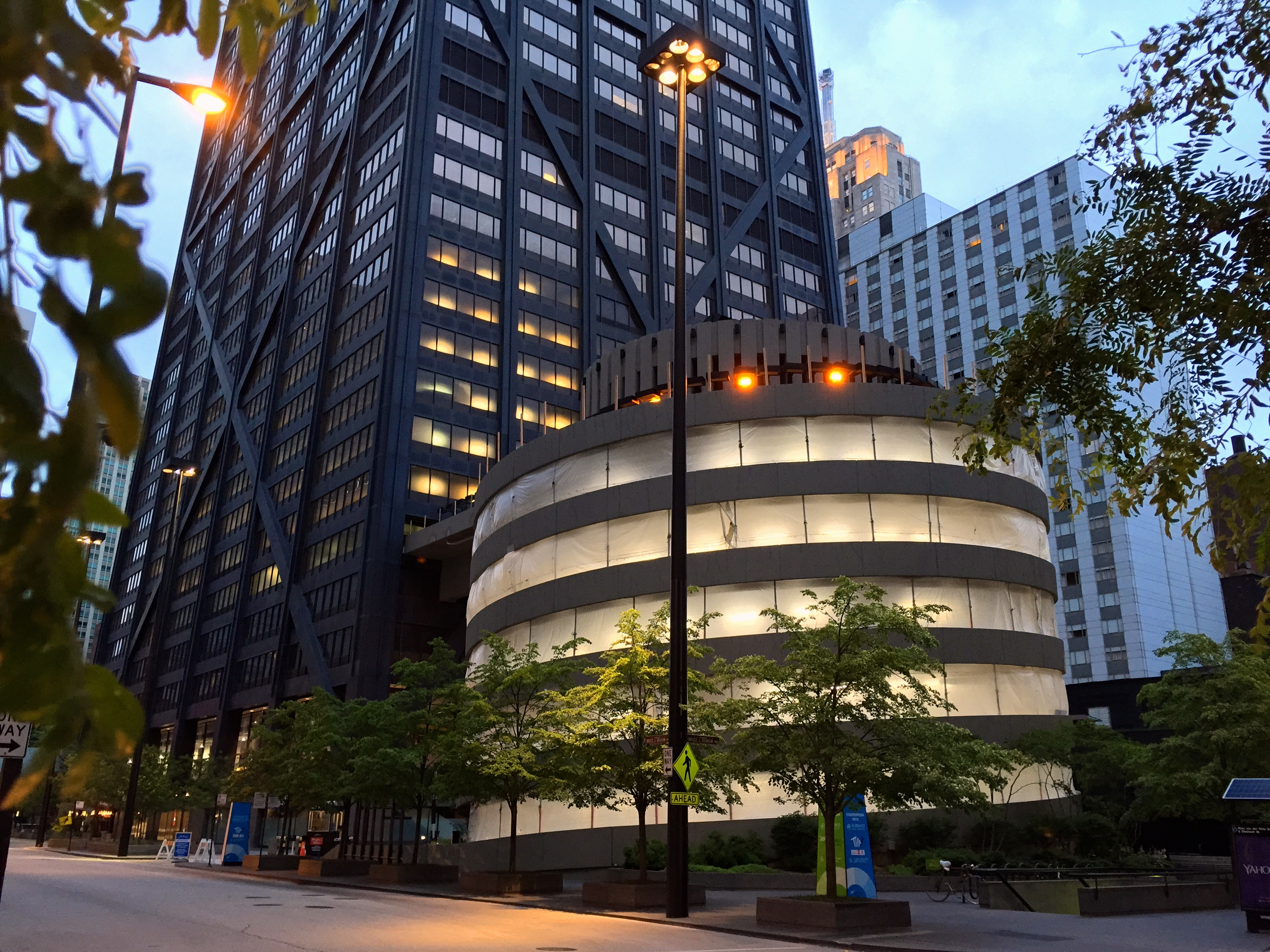
Spiral vehicle ramp to the parking garage, photographed in 2015

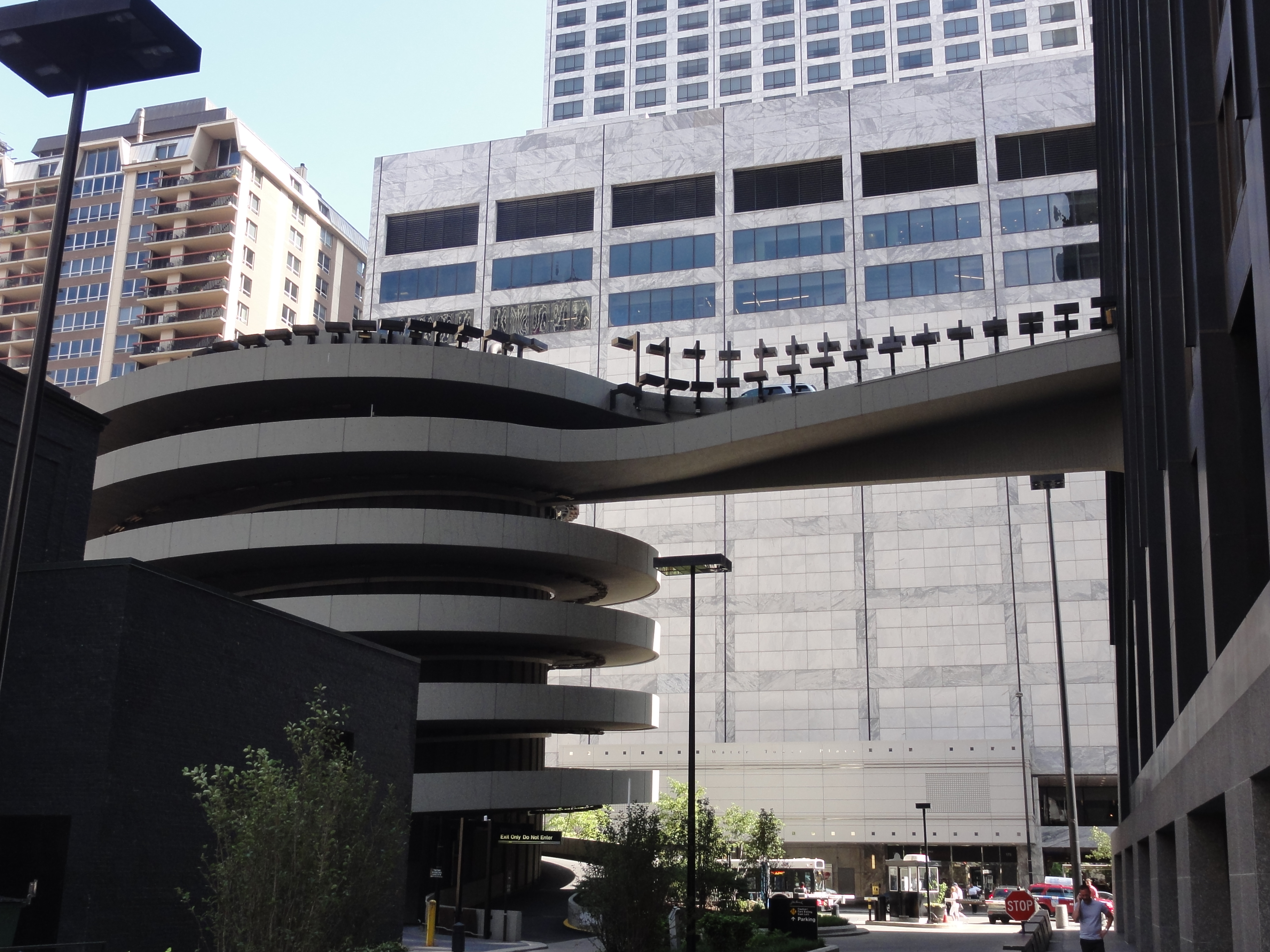
Spiral vehicle ramp to the parking garage, photographed in 2012

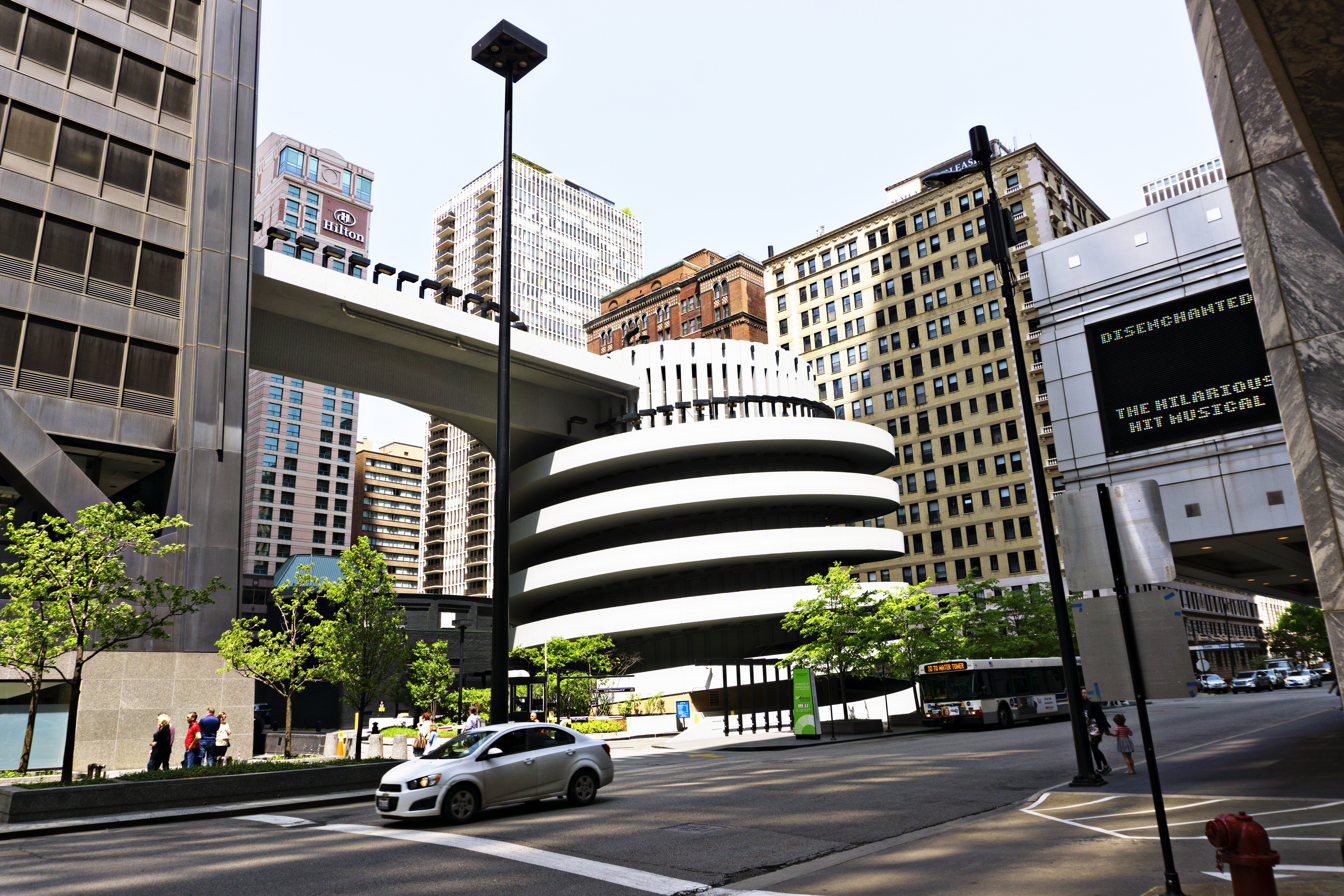
Spiral vehicle ramp to the parking garage, photographed in 2016

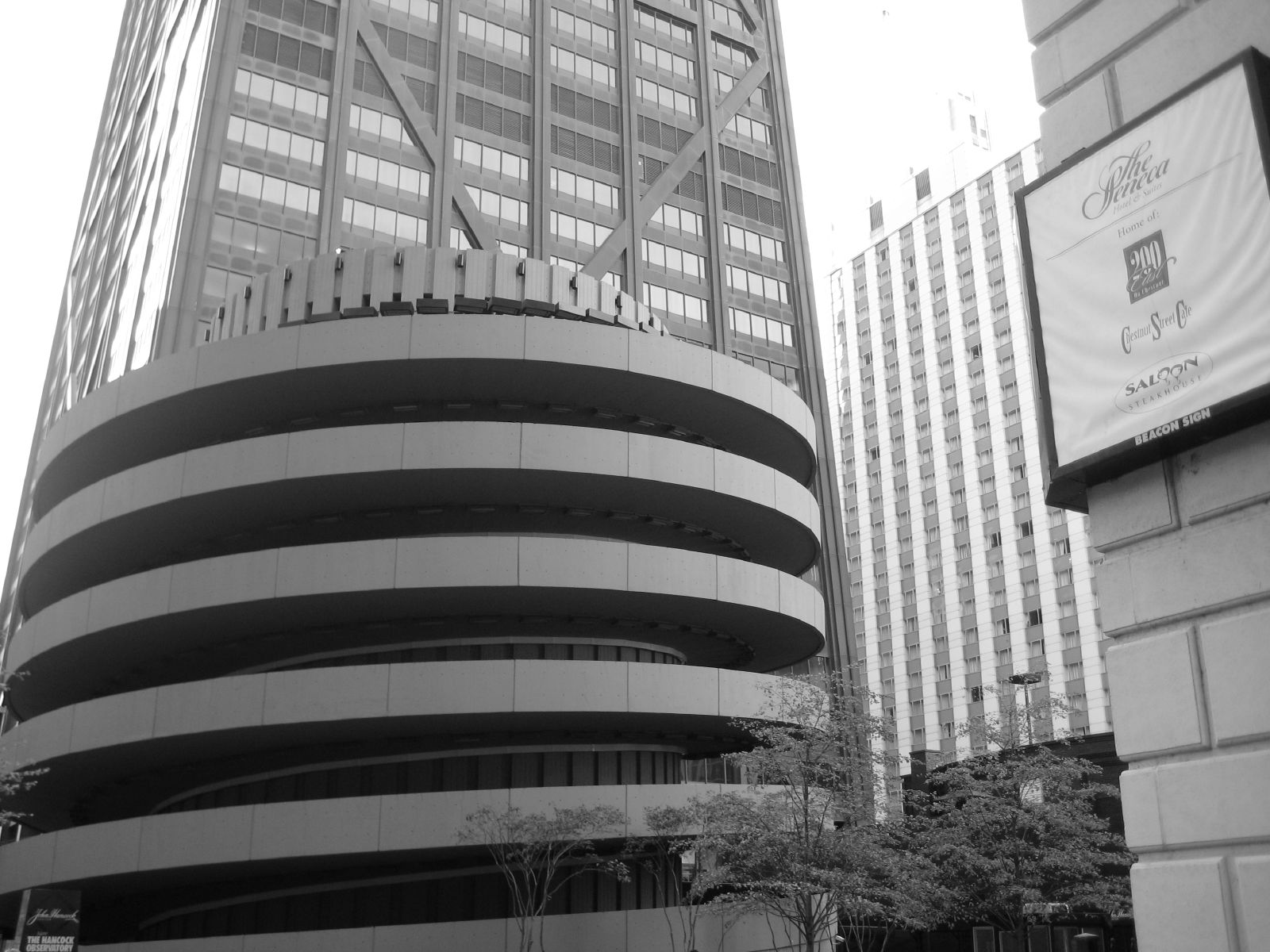
Spiral vehicle ramp to the parking garage, photographed in 2007

== Other features ==
=== Retail plaza ===
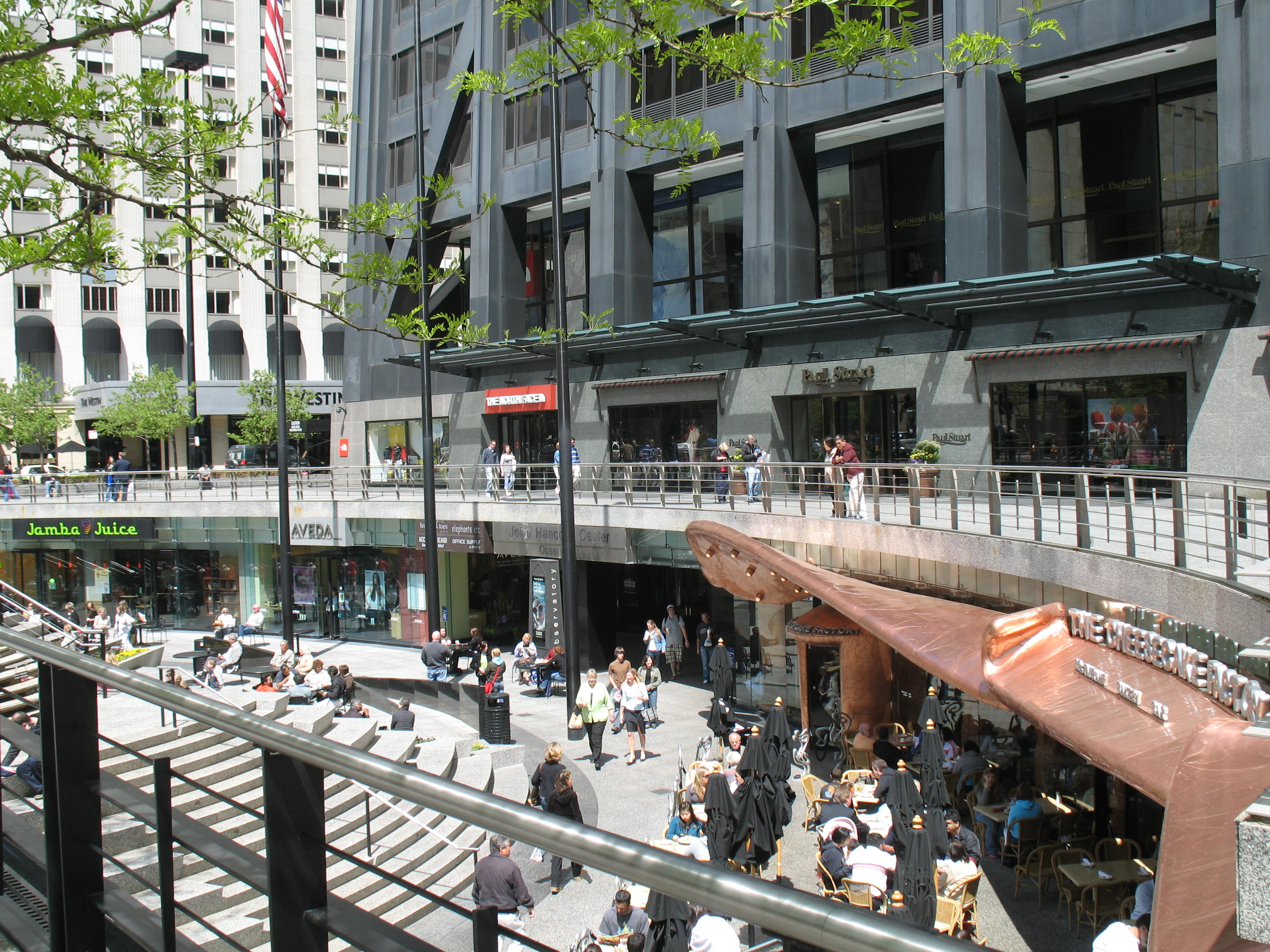
Plaza in 2007

The building features a two-level outdoor plaza along its Michigan Avenue face. The plaza contains retail and dining tenants. The top level of the plaza is at street level, while the lower level is sunken below the street level.

Current tenants include The Cheesecake Factory and The North Face. Past tenants have included Best Buy.

The plaza was originally rectangular in shape. Per the Chicago Tribune, the plaza was modeled after the plaza at New York City's Rockefeller Center. The plaza's design featured a fountain pool that would be turned into an ice rink in colder weather.

In 1988, plans were unveiled by the John Hancock Mutual Life Insurance Company (the owners of the building at the time) to replace the plaza with a "$20 million (Note: equivalent to $54.4 million in 2025) glass and marble three-story atrium". One rationale cited by building's management was they claimed that access to the building's ground level was complicated by the need of pedestrians to circumnavigate around the courtyard in order to reach the street-level entrance to the building's lobby. They also cited a belief that the building's entrance was too understated for a building of its level of prominence. This atrium proposal faced backlash from local residents who felt that such an addition would mar the appearance of the landmark building. In 1989, newly-elected mayor Richard M. Daley criticized the proposed atrium and the plans were ultimately abandoned.

In 1994, the plaza was renovated, with the sunken portion transforming from its previous rectangular shape to an elliptical shape. In 1999, Chicago Tribune architecture critic Blair Kamin wrote that this renovation had made the plaza a more "welcoming" space. This renovation came after the more dramatic late-1980s renovation plans were abandoned. A further $10 million renovation for the plaza was considered by the building's owners in the mid-2010s which would have added features such as video screens and decorative prisms to the plaza.

Images of the plaza
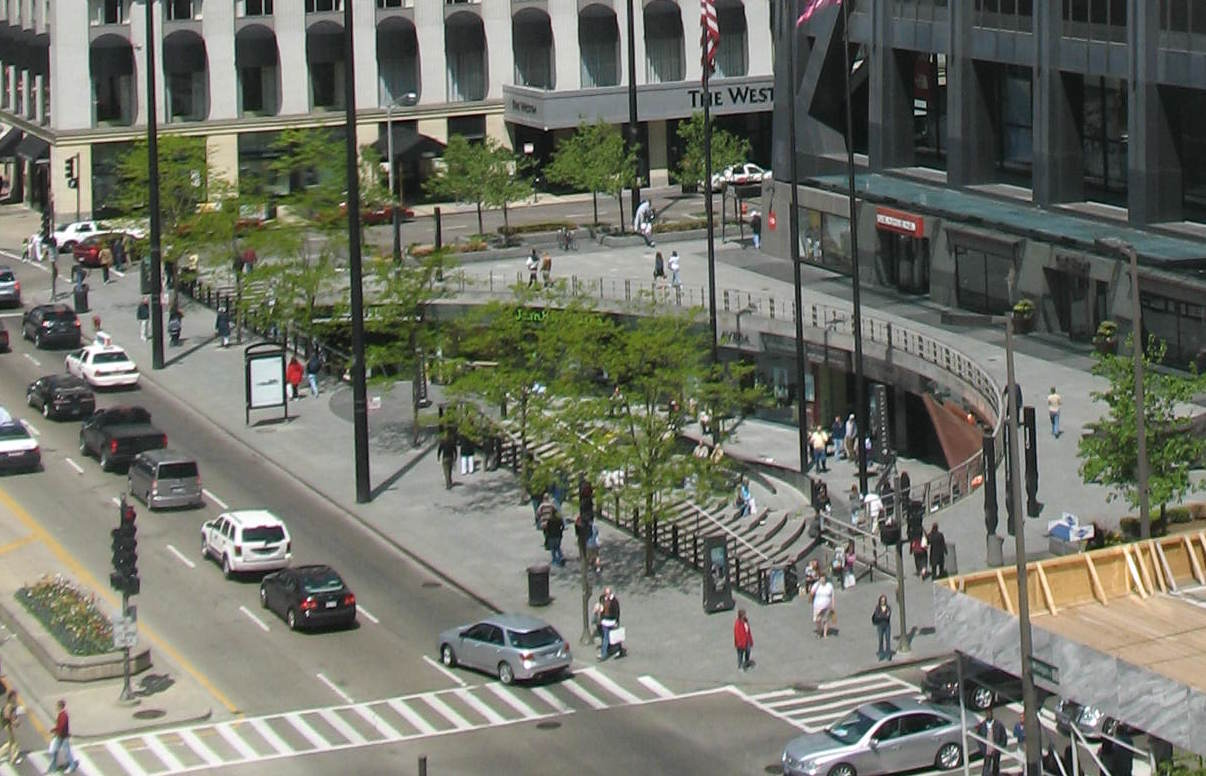
Plaza in 2007

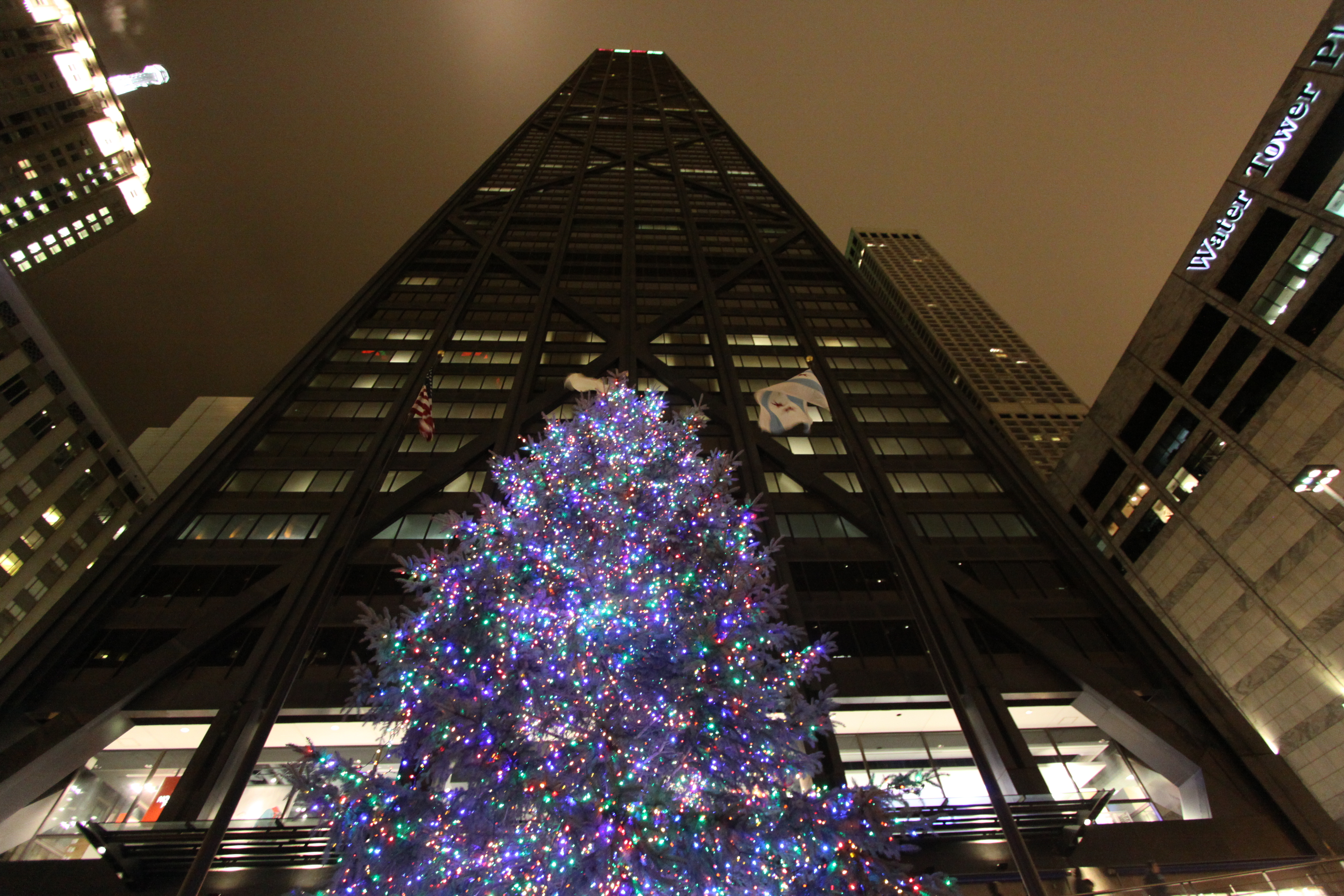
Christmas tree in the plaza in December 2011

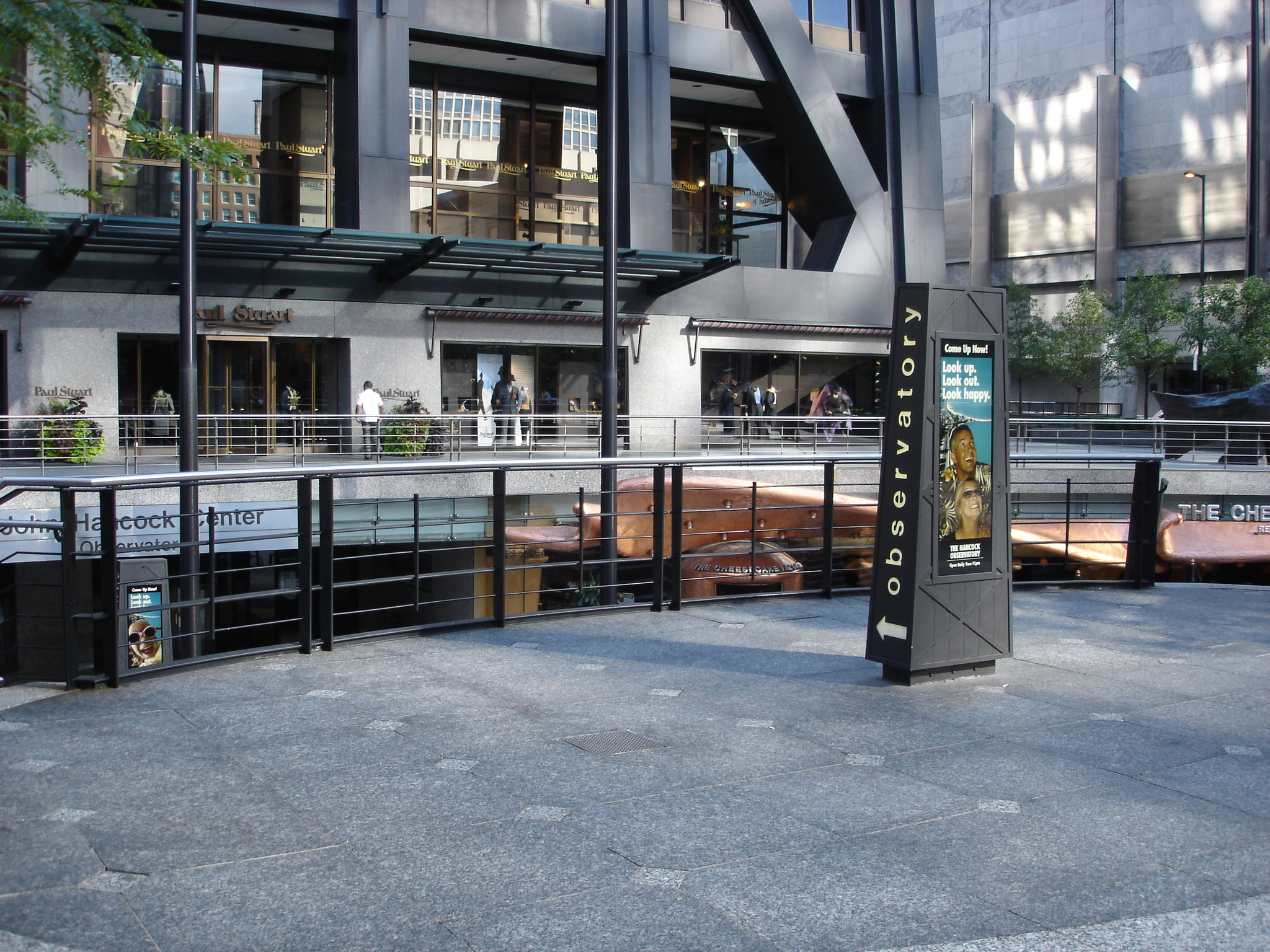
Plaza from Michigan Avenue street level in 2005

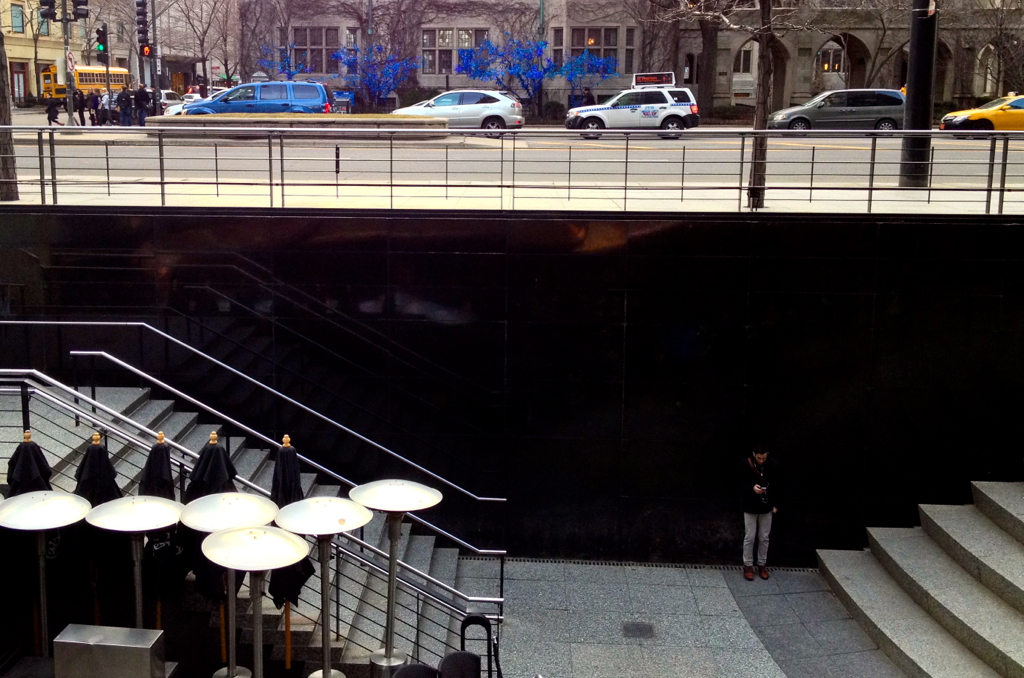
Plaza in 2015

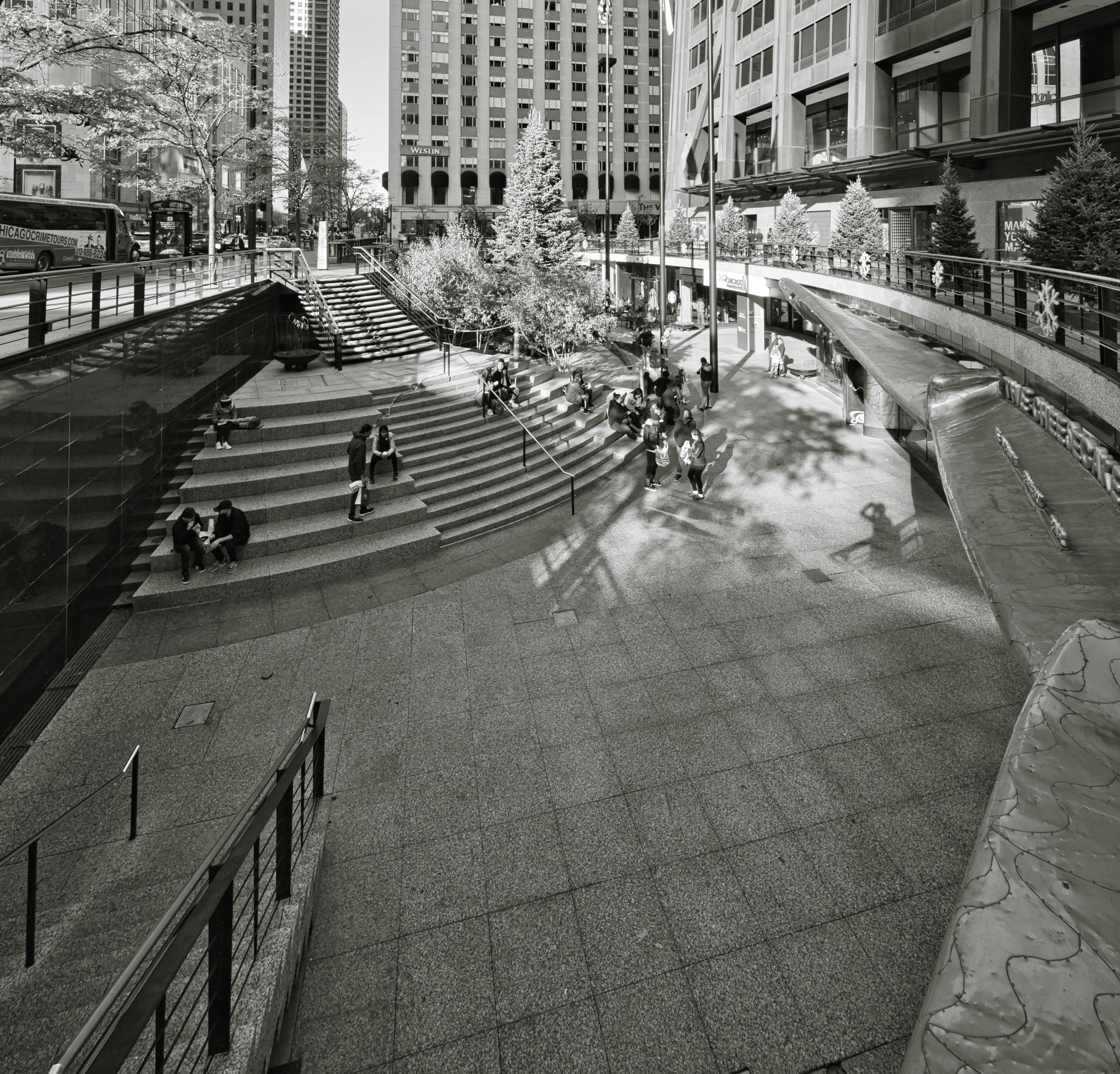
Black and white photograph of the plaza in 2021

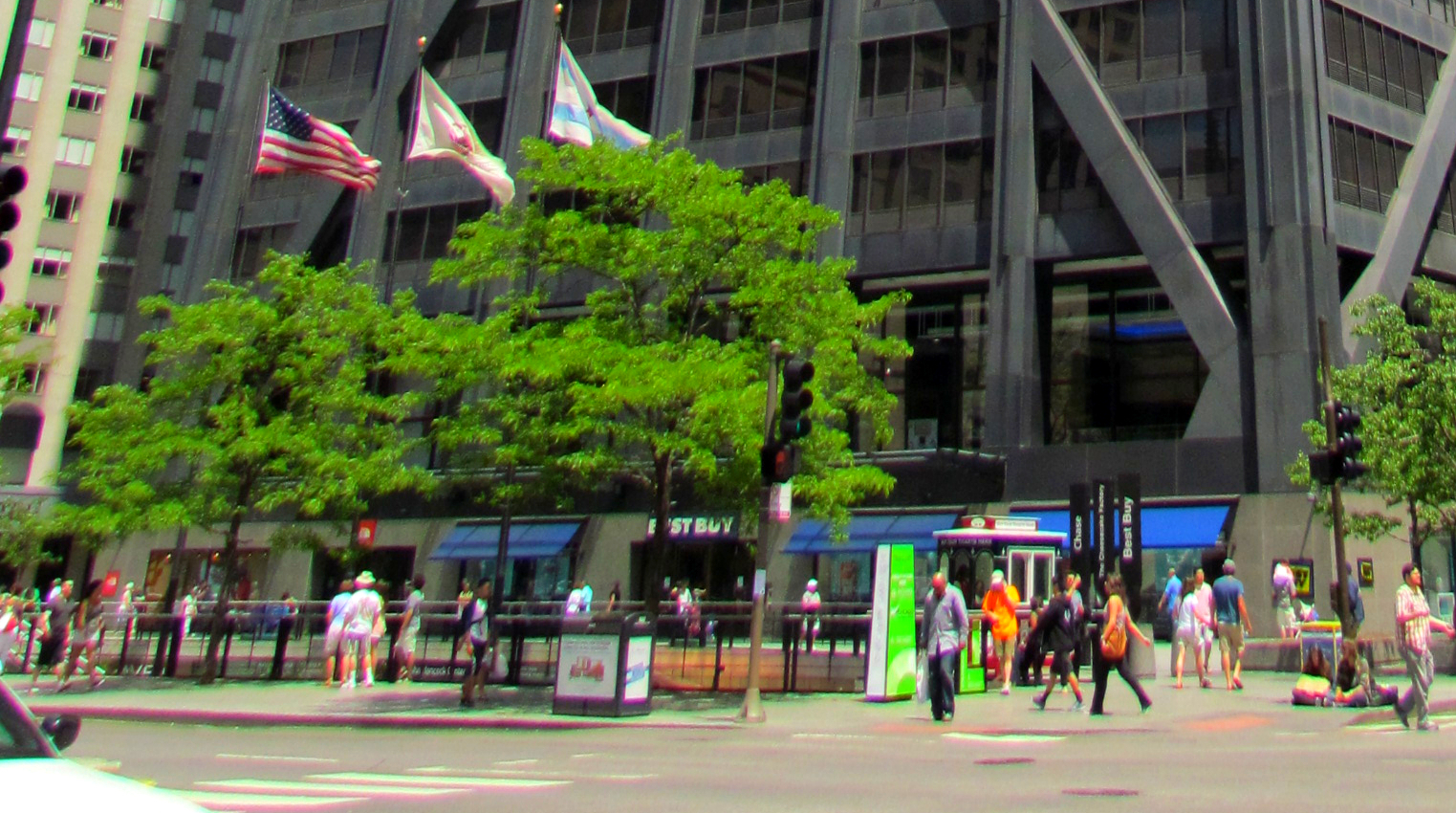
Plaza from Michigan Avenue street level in 2014

=== Antennas ===
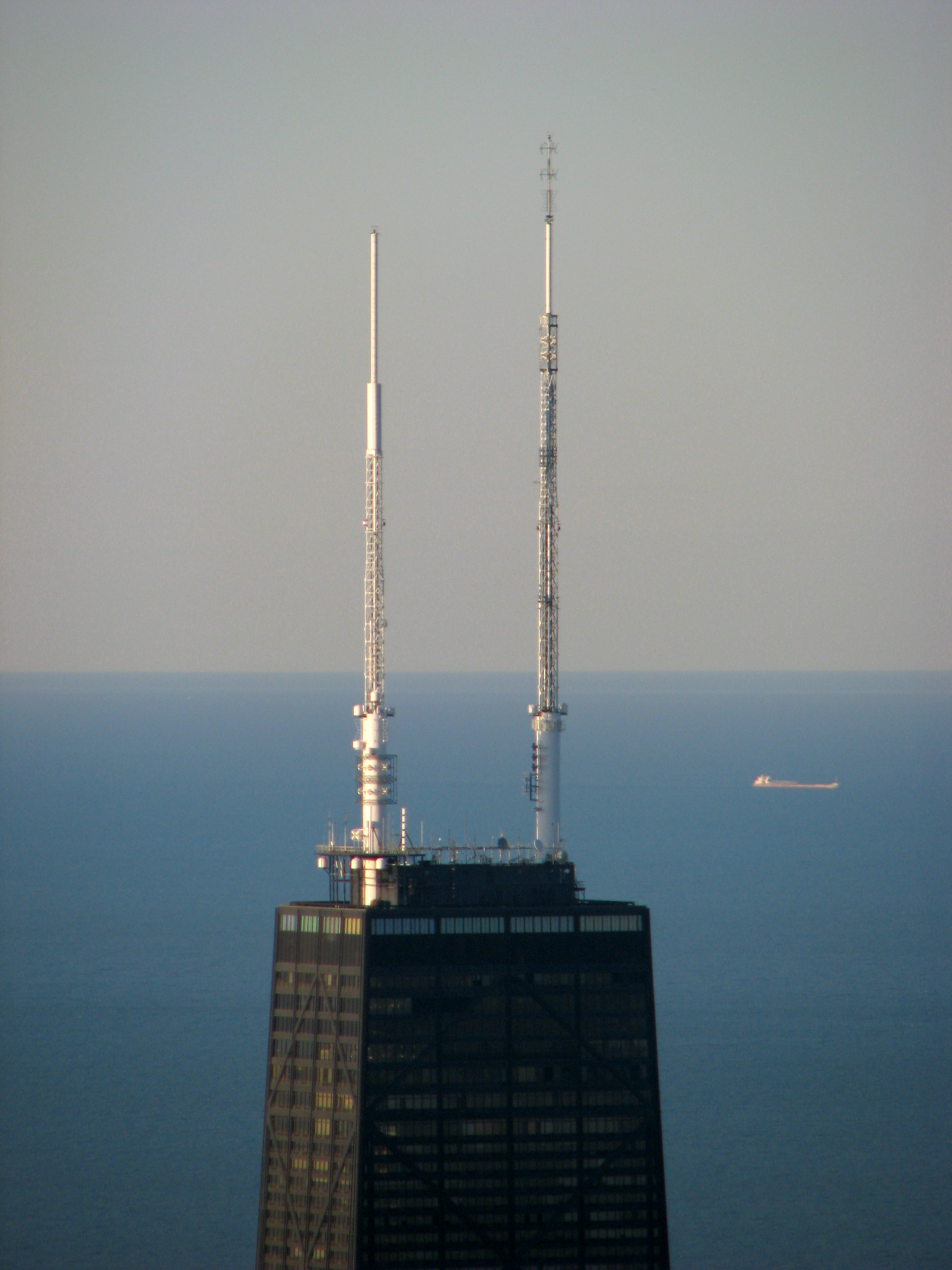
Antennas and the top of the building in 2009

Since its completion, the tower has been topped by two antenna structures. These antenna superstructures support a large number of broadcast antenna equipment. At the time of the tower's completion, both antenna structures were 350 feet (110 metres) in height, and RCA had given the architects of the building an estimate that 700 feet of antenna structure would be required to accommodate all of the city's radio and television stations. In 2002, the eastern antenna tower was extended to a height of 378 feet (115 metres) in order to enable WBBM-TV to add new digital antenna equipment at a height greater than the roof height of the Sears Tower (Willis Tower). Subsequently, the western antenna tower was reduced to a height of 285 feet (87 metres).

For a long time, the antenna towers utilized incandescent red lights and a red and white paint scheme to provide a visibility to aviation in compliance with federal regulations. However, in order to forgo the expense and effort of annually reapplying striped paint to the antenna towers, the tower instead installed red strobe lights atop the tower and eliminated the striped paint scheme, as striped paint is not required if structures are topped by such lights.

A sizable number of television and radio stations utilize the antenna towers. Many stations maintain broadcast equipment on both the John Hancock Center and the Willis Tower's antenna structures in order to have both a primary and backup broadcasting point.

In November 2012, an affiliate of Boston-based American Tower paid $70 million (Note: equivalent to $98.2 million in 2025) to acquire ownership of the antennas.

Images of the antennas
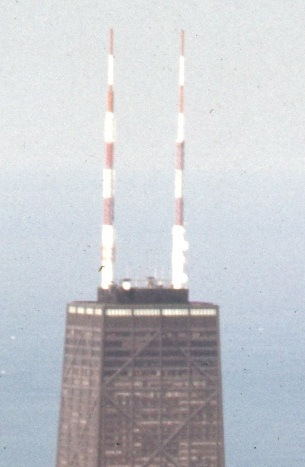
John Hancock Center in 1974, with the original striped paint scheme visible on its antenna towers

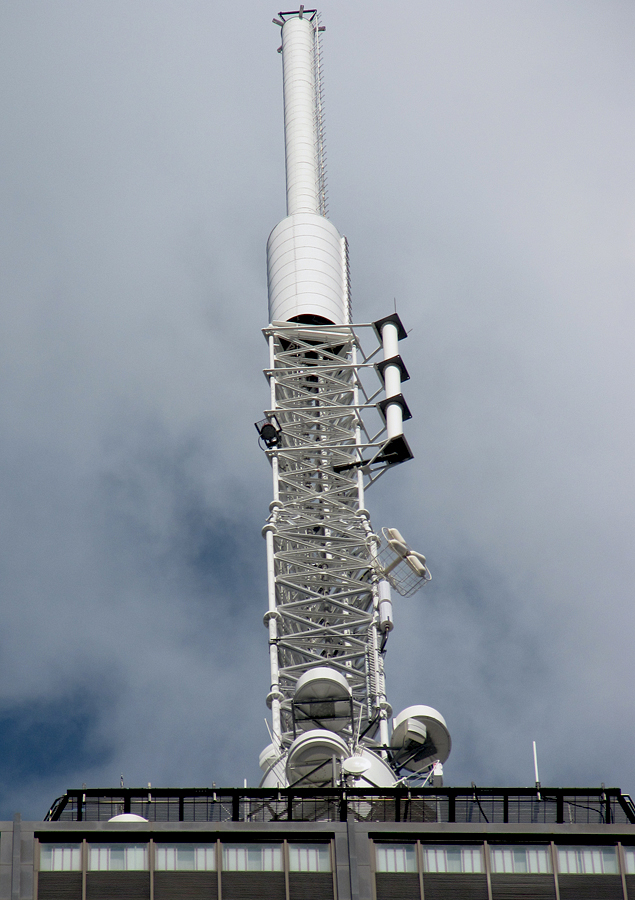
Closeup view of an antenna in 2009

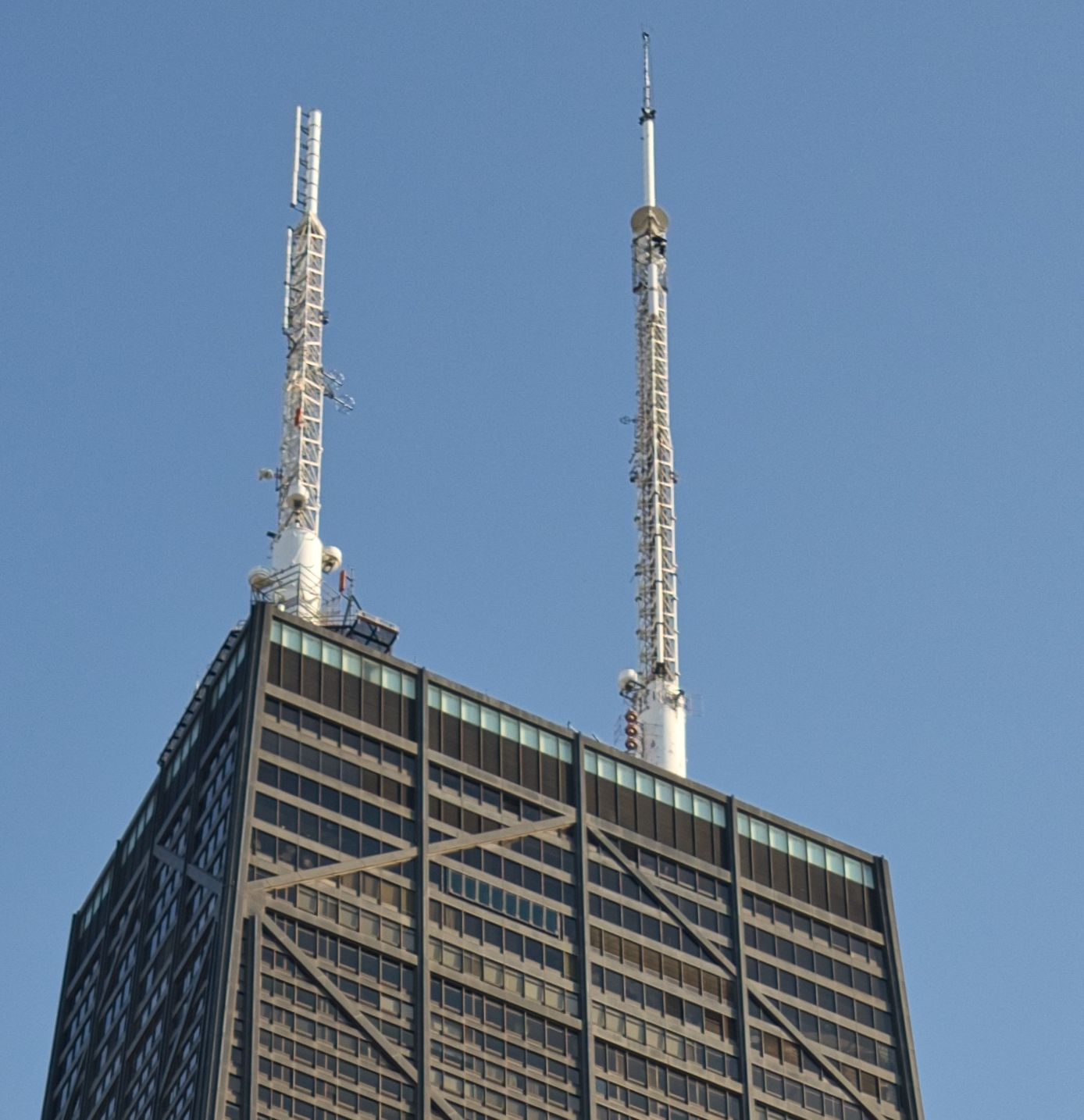
View of antenna towers in 2022

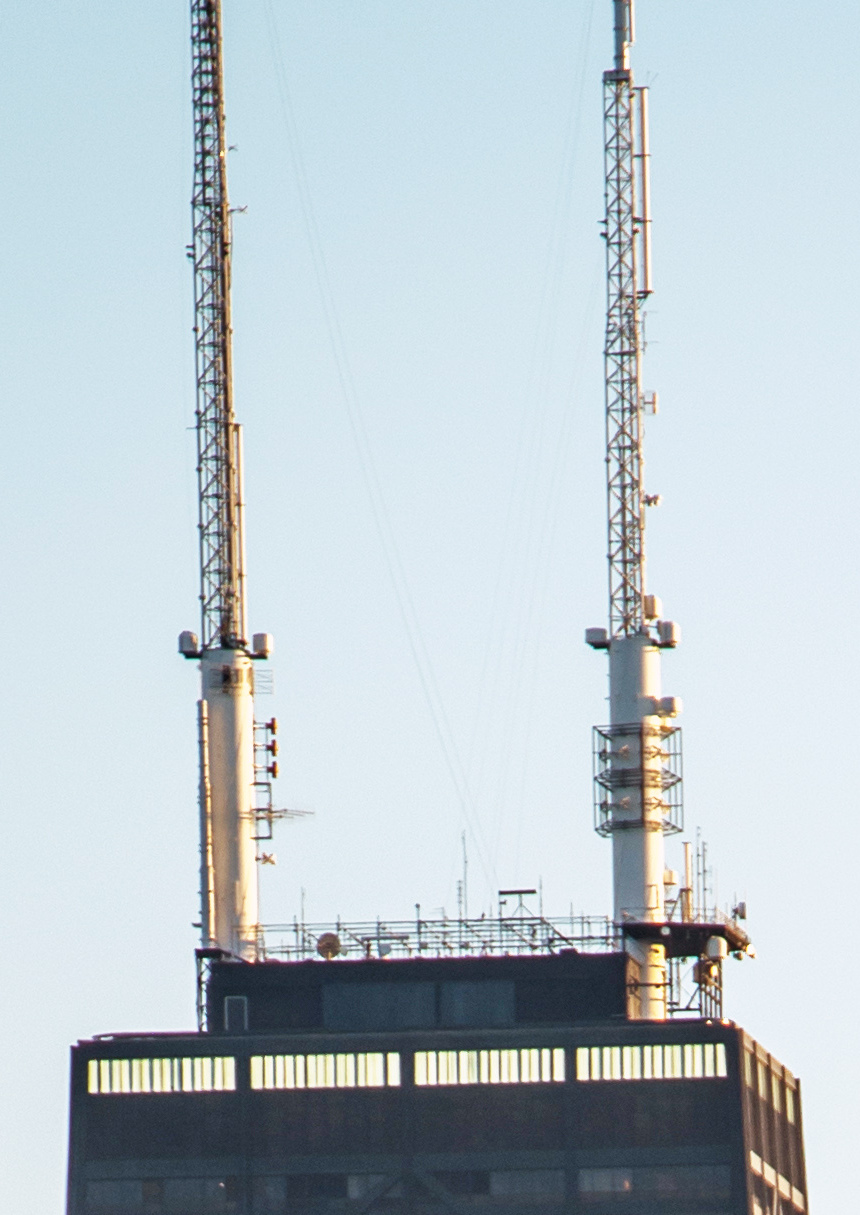
Antennas in 2015

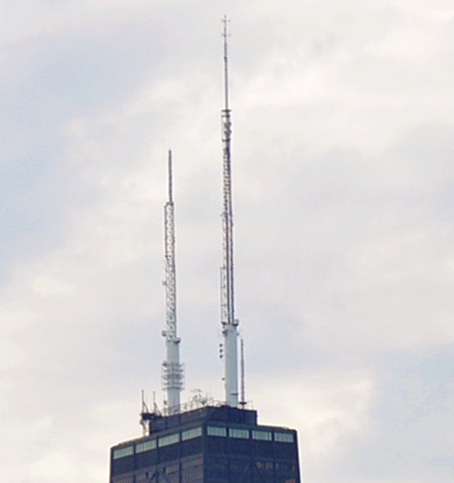
Antennas in 2016

== See also ==
- Architecture of Chicago
- List of buildings and structures
- List of buildings with 100 floors or more
- List of tallest buildings in the world
- List of tallest buildings in Chicago
- List of tallest buildings in the United States
- List of tallest buildings and structures in the world
- List of tallest freestanding structures in the world
- List of tallest freestanding steel structures

== Footnotes ==
Records
Preceded by Richard J. Daley Center	Tallest building in Chicago; 1969–1972; 1,128 ft	Succeeded by Aon Center
Preceded by Prudential Tower	Tallest building in the United States outside of New York City; 1969–1972; 1,128 ft	Succeeded by Aon Center
