= Skyscraper =

Tall habitable building

The Burj Khalifa in Dubai, UAE, the tallest building in the world

A skyscraper is a very tall building or otherwise permanently habitable structure, typically defined as reaching a minimum height of 150 metres (492 ft) in height; however, there remains no universally accepted definition of a skyscraper, other than being a high-rise. Skyscrapers can host a variety of spaces, typically including office, commercial, hotel, and residential space. Skyscrapers are a common feature in the downtown or central business districts (CBD) of major cities, especially in the Americas, Asia, and Australia, often due to a high demand for space and limited availability of land.

The majority of skyscrapers are designed with a steel frame and shear walls that support curtain walls. These curtain walls either bear on the framework below or are suspended from the framework above, rather than resting on load-bearing walls of conventional construction. Some early skyscrapers have a steel frame that enables the construction of load-bearing walls taller than those made of reinforced concrete. Modern skyscraper walls are not load-bearing, and are characterized by large surface areas of windows made possible by steel frames and curtain walls. However, skyscrapers can have curtain walls that mimic conventional walls with a small surface area of windows. Modern skyscrapers often have a tubular structure, and are designed to act like a hollow cylinder to resist wind, seismic, and other lateral loads. To appear more slender, allow less wind exposure and transmit more daylight to the ground, many skyscrapers are built with setbacks, which in some cases is also structurally required.

Skyscrapers first emerged in the United States towards the end of the 19th century, especially in New York City and Chicago. Early 20th‑century skyscraper construction expanded to several other countries, but slowed sharply during the Great Depression of the 1930s and did not fully resume until the 1950s. A new wave of skyscraper building occurred in many United States cities from the 1960s through the 1980s. From the late 20th century onward, a significant acceleration of skyscraper development took place, with a notable boom in East Asia and Southeast Asia, in the 1990s. China has since built more skyscrapers than any other country. Today, skyscrapers are a global phenomenon, present in over 70 countries.

There are over seven thousand skyscrapers over 150 m (492 ft) in height worldwide, most of which were built in the 21st century. Over three quarters of skyscrapers taller than 150 m (492 ft) are located in Asia. Twenty cities in the world have at least a hundred skyscrapers that are taller than 150 m (492 ft), most recently Singapore, Hangzhou, Moscow, and Toronto in 2025. The city with the most skyscrapers in the world is Hong Kong, with a total of 569 skyscrapers; followed by Shenzhen, China, with 465; New York City, United States, with 324; and Dubai, United Arab Emirates, with 269. The tallest skyscraper in the world is the Burj Khalifa in Dubai, with a height of 828 m (2,717 ft).

== Definition ==
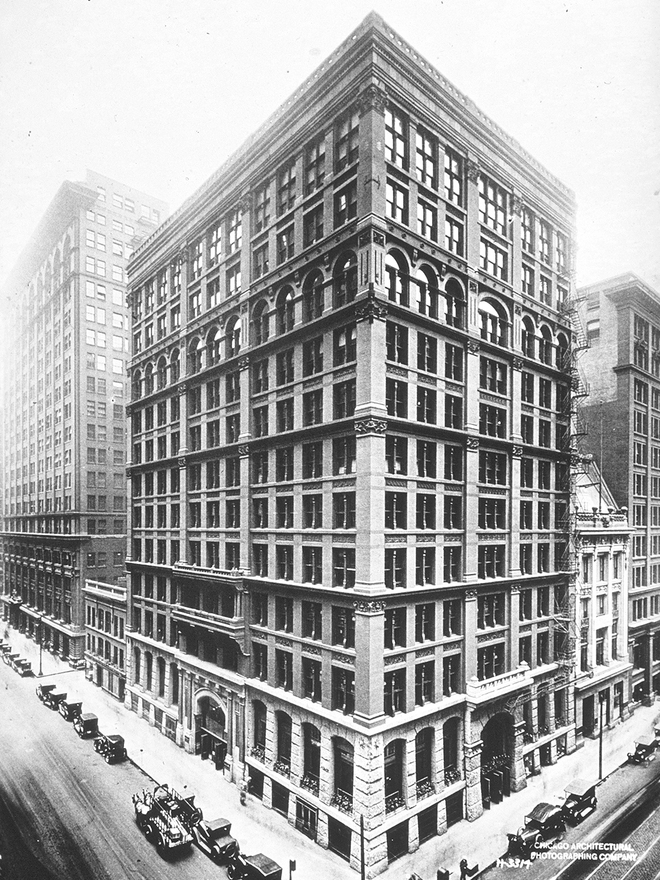
By some measures, what came to be known as a "skyscraper" first appeared in Chicago with the 1885 completion of the world's first largely steel-frame structure, the Home Insurance Building. It was demolished in 1931.

The term "skyscraper" was first applied to buildings of steel-framed construction of at least 10 stories in the late 19th century, a result of public amazement at the tall buildings being built in major United States cities like New York City, Philadelphia, Boston, Chicago, Detroit, and St. Louis.

The first steel-frame skyscraper was the Home Insurance Building, originally 10 stories with a height of 42 m or 138 ft, in Chicago in 1885; two additional stories were added. Some point to Philadelphia's 10-story Jayne Building (1849–50) as a proto-skyscraper, or to New York's seven-floor Equitable Life Building, built in 1870. Steel skeleton construction has allowed for today's supertall skyscrapers now being built worldwide. The nomination of one structure versus another being the first skyscraper, and why, depends on what factors are stressed.

The structural definition of the word skyscraper was refined later by architectural historians, based on engineering developments of the 1880s that had enabled construction of tall multi-story buildings. This definition was based on the steel skeleton—as opposed to constructions of load-bearing masonry, which passed their practical limit in 1891 with Chicago's Monadnock Building.

What is the chief characteristic of the tall office building? It is lofty. It must be tall. The force and power of altitude must be in it, the glory and pride of exaltation must be in it. It must be every inch a proud and soaring thing, rising in sheer exaltation that from bottom to top it is a unit without a single dissenting line.

— Louis Sullivan's The Tall Office Building Artistically Considered (1896)

Some structural engineers define a high-rise as any vertical construction for which wind is a more significant load factor than earthquake or weight. This criterion fits not only high-rises but some other tall structures, such as towers.

Different organizations from the United States and Europe define skyscrapers as buildings at least 150 m (490 ft) in height or taller, with "supertall" skyscrapers for buildings higher than 300 m (984 ft) and "megatall" skyscrapers for those taller than 600 m (1,969 ft).

== History ==
=== Precursors ===
The tallest structure in ancient times was the 146 m (479 ft) Great Pyramid of Giza in ancient Egypt, built in the 26th century BC. It was not surpassed in height for thousands of years, the 160 m (520 ft) Lincoln Cathedral having exceeded it in 1311–1549, before its central spire collapsed. The latter in turn was not surpassed until the 555-foot (169 m) Washington Monument in 1884, which was surpassed by the Eiffel Tower in 1889, the first ever supertall structure. In 1930, the Chrysler Building surpassed the Eiffel Tower by pinnacle height, becoming the tallest structure built until then and the first supertall skyscraper by pinnacle height, only to be surpassed a year later in every regard by the Empire State Building as the first supertall skyscraper also by roof height.

High-rise apartments flourished in classical antiquity. Ancient Roman insulae in imperial cities reached 10 and more stories. Beginning with Augustus (r. 30 BC-14 AD), several emperors attempted to establish limits of 20–25 m (66–82 ft) for multi-stories buildings, but were met with only limited success. Lower floors were typically occupied by shops or wealthy families, with the upper rented to the lower classes. Surviving Oxyrhynchus Papyri indicate that seven-stories buildings existed in provincial towns such as in 3rd century AD Hermopolis in Roman Egypt.

The skylines of many important medieval cities had large numbers of high-rise urban towers, built by the wealthy for defense and status. The residential Towers of 12th century Bologna numbered between 80 and 100 at a time, the tallest of which is the 97.2 m (319 ft) high Asinelli Tower. A Florentine law of 1251 decreed that all urban buildings be immediately reduced to less than 26 m (85 ft). Even medium-sized towns of the era are known to have proliferations of towers, such as the 72 towers that ranged up to 51 m (167 ft) height in San Gimignano.

The medieval Egyptian city of Fustat housed many high-rise residential buildings, which Al-Muqaddasi in the 10th century described as resembling minarets. Nasir Khusraw in the early 11th century described some of them rising up to 14 stories, with roof gardens on the top floor complete with ox-drawn water wheels for irrigating them. Cairo in the 16th century had high-rise apartment buildings where the two lower floors were for commercial and storage purposes and the multiple stories above them were rented out to tenants. An early example of a city consisting entirely of high-rise housing is the 16th-century city of Shibam in Yemen. Shibam was made up of over 500 tower houses, each one rising 5 to 11 stories high, with each floor being an apartment occupied by a single family. The city was built in this way in order to protect it from Bedouin attacks. Shibam still has the tallest mudbrick buildings in the world, with many of them over 30 m (98 ft) high.

An early modern example of high-rise housing was in 17th-century Edinburgh, Scotland, where a defensive city wall defined the boundaries of the city. Due to the restricted land area available for development, the houses increased in height instead. Buildings of 11 stories were common, and there are records of buildings as high as 14 stories. Many of the stone-built structures can still be seen today in the old town of Edinburgh. The oldest iron framed building in the world, although only partially iron framed, is The Flaxmill in Shrewsbury, England. Built in 1797, it is seen as the "grandfather of skyscrapers", since its fireproof combination of cast iron columns and cast iron beams developed into the modern steel frame that made modern skyscrapers possible. In 2013 funding was confirmed to convert the derelict building into offices.

=== Early skyscrapers ===
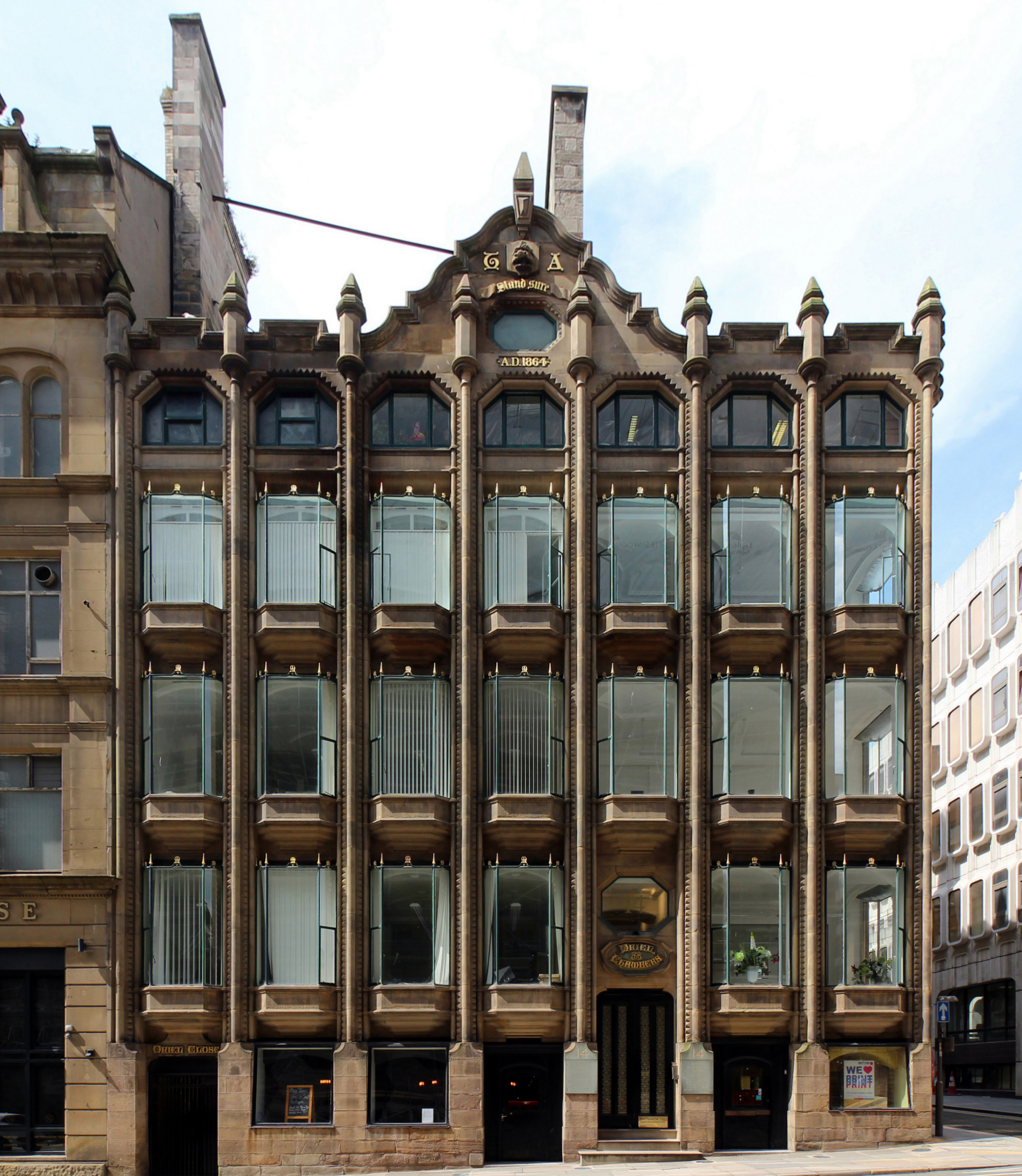
Built in 1864, Oriel Chambers in Liverpool is the world's first metal framed glass curtain walled building. The stone mullions are decorative.

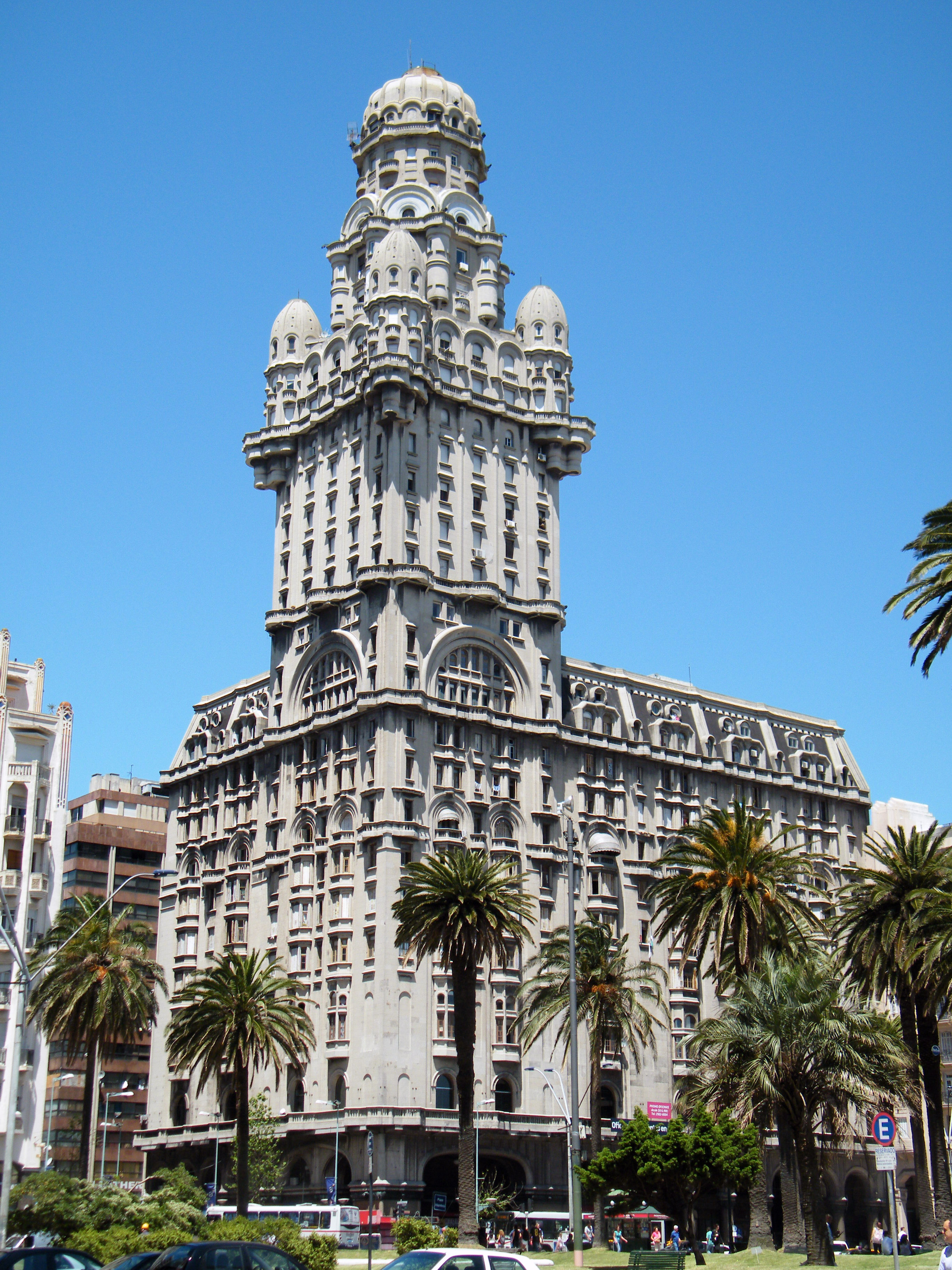
At its completion in 1928, Palacio Salvo in Montevideo, was the tallest reinforced concrete structure at 100 m (330 ft) high.

Early skyscrapers

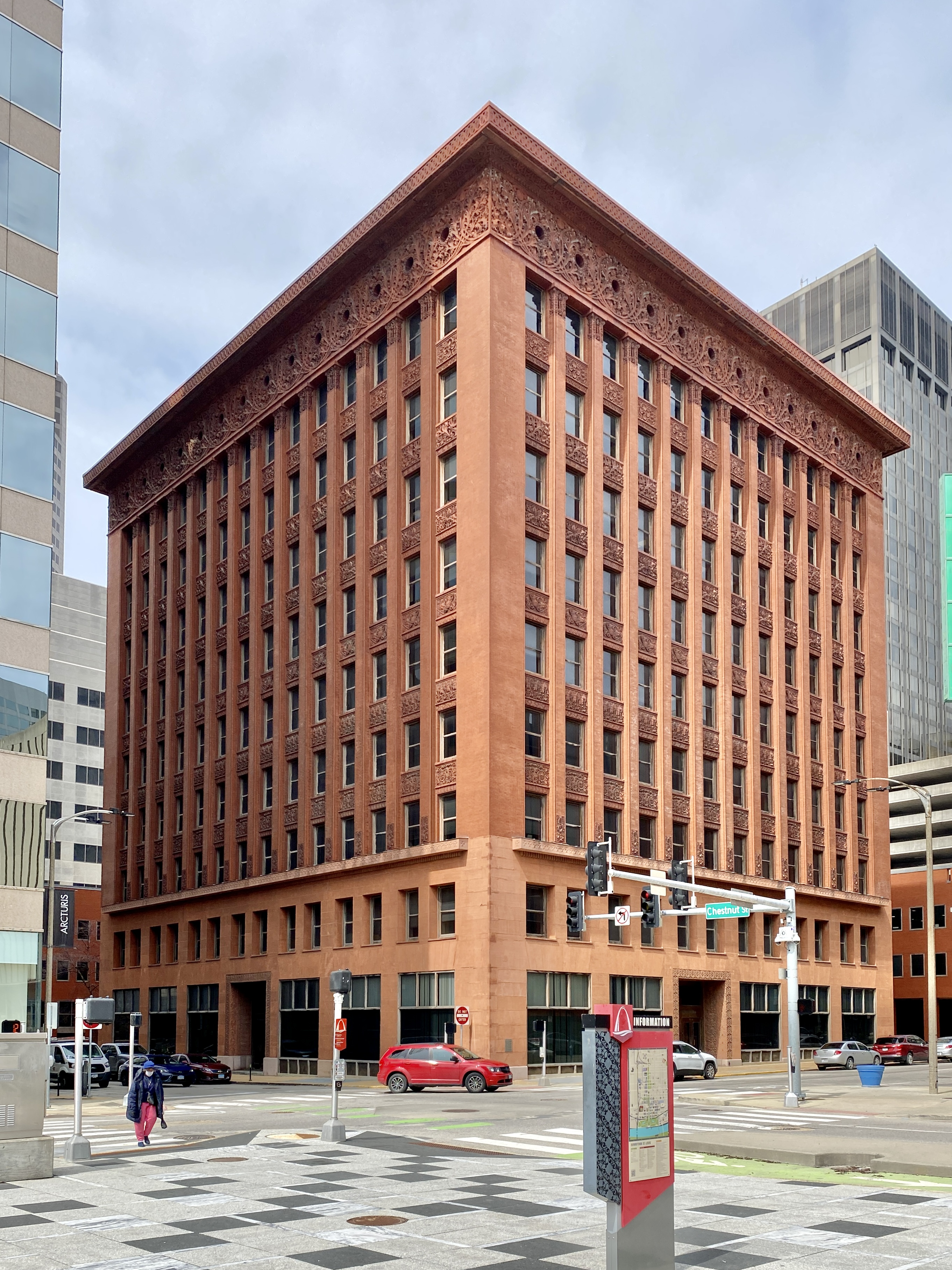
Wainwright Building (1891) in St. Louis

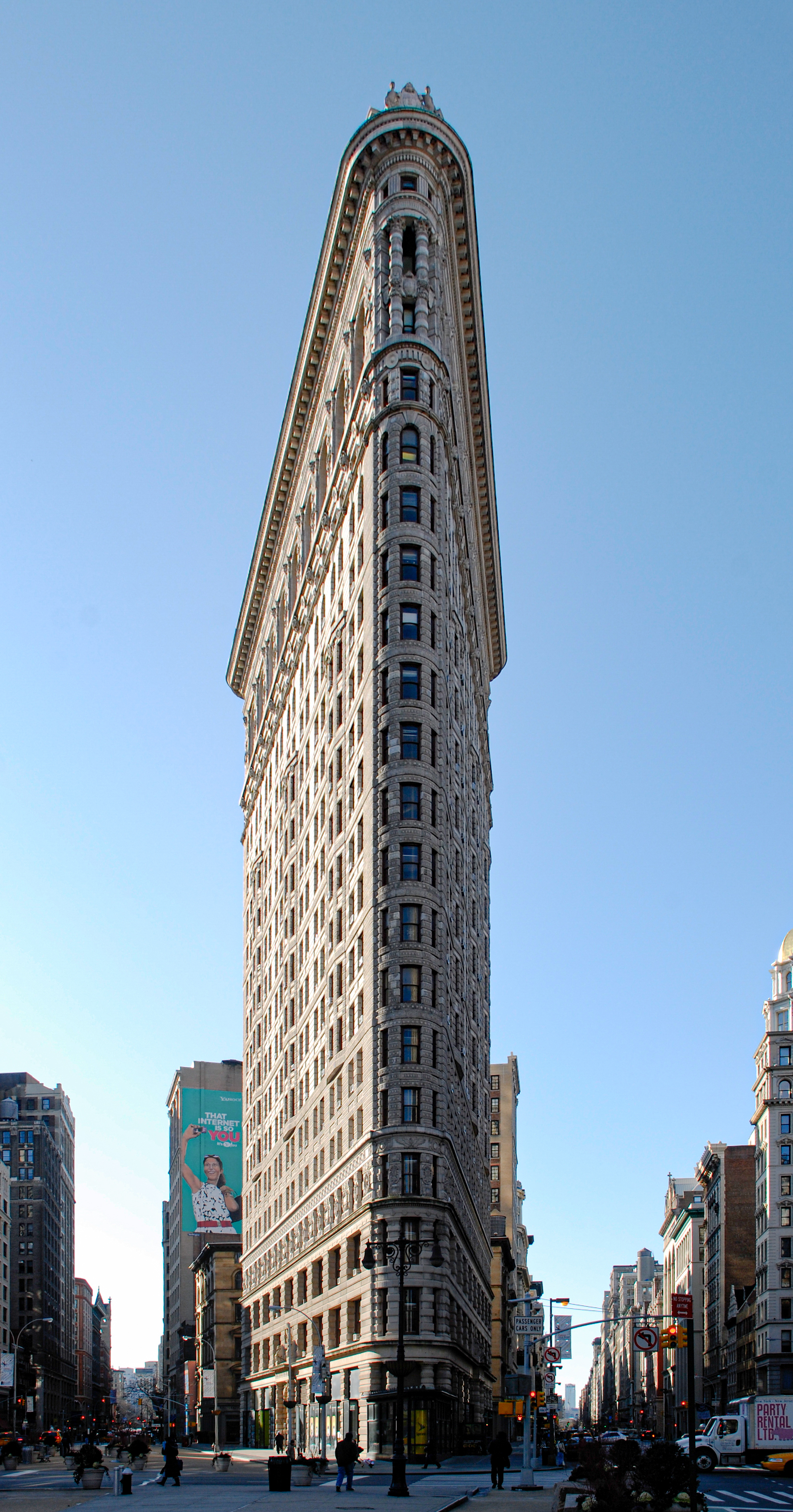
Flatiron Building (1902), in New York City

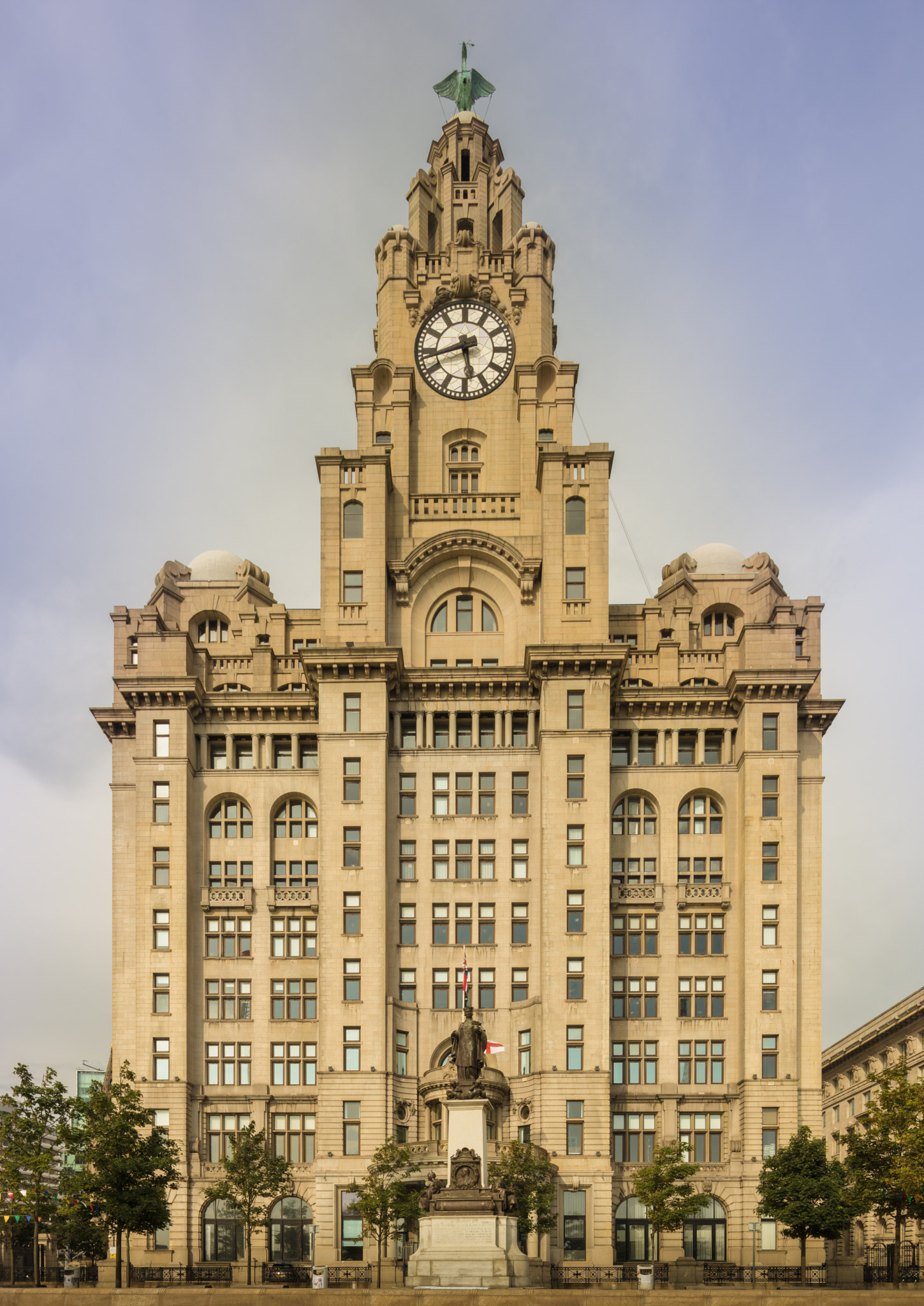
Royal Liver Building (1911), in Liverpool

In 1857, Elisha Otis introduced the safety elevator at the E. V. Haughwout Building in New York City, allowing convenient and safe transport to buildings' upper floors. Otis later introduced the first commercial passenger elevators to the Equitable Life Building in 1870, considered by some architectural historians to be the first skyscraper. Another crucial development was the use of a steel frame instead of stone or brick, otherwise the walls on the lower floors on a tall building would be too thick to be practical. An early development in this area was Oriel Chambers in Liverpool, England, built in 1864. It was only five floors high. The Royal Academy of Arts states, "critics at the time were horrified by its 'large agglomerations of protruding plate glass bubbles'. In fact, it was a precursor to Modernist architecture, being the first building in the world to feature a metal-framed glass curtain wall, a design element which creates light, airy interiors and has since been used the world over as a defining feature of skyscrapers".

Further developments led to what many individuals and organizations consider the world's first skyscraper, the ten-story Home Insurance Building in Chicago, built from 1884 to 1885. While its original height of 42.1 m (138 ft) does not qualify as a skyscraper today, it was record setting for the day. The building of tall buildings in the 1880s gave the skyscraper its first architectural movement, broadly termed the Chicago School, which developed what has been called the Commercial Style.

The architect, Major William Le Baron Jenney, created a load-bearing structural frame. In this building, a steel frame supported the entire weight of the walls, instead of load-bearing walls carrying the weight of the building. This was then draped with a stone curtain for aesthetic purposes. This development led to the "Chicago skeleton" form of construction. In addition to the steel frame, the Home Insurance Building also utilized fireproofing, elevators, and electrical wiring, key elements in most skyscrapers today.

Burnham and Root's 45 m (148 ft) Rand McNally Building in Chicago, 1889, was the first all-steel framed skyscraper, while Louis Sullivan's 41 m (135 ft) Wainwright Building in St. Louis, Missouri, 1891, was the first steel-framed building with soaring vertical bands to emphasize the height of the building and is therefore considered to be the first early skyscraper. In 1889, the Mole Antonelliana in Italy was 197 m (549 ft) tall.

Most early skyscrapers emerged in the land-strapped areas of New York City and Chicago toward the end of the 19th century. A land boom in Melbourne, Australia between 1888 and 1891 spurred the creation of a significant number of early skyscrapers, though none of these were steel reinforced and few remain today. Height limits and fire restrictions were later introduced. In the late 1800s, London builders found building heights limited due to issues with existing buildings. High-rise development in London is restricted at certain sites if it would obstruct protected views of St Paul's Cathedral and other historic buildings. This policy, 'St Paul's Heights', has officially been in operation since 1927.

Interwar skyscrapers

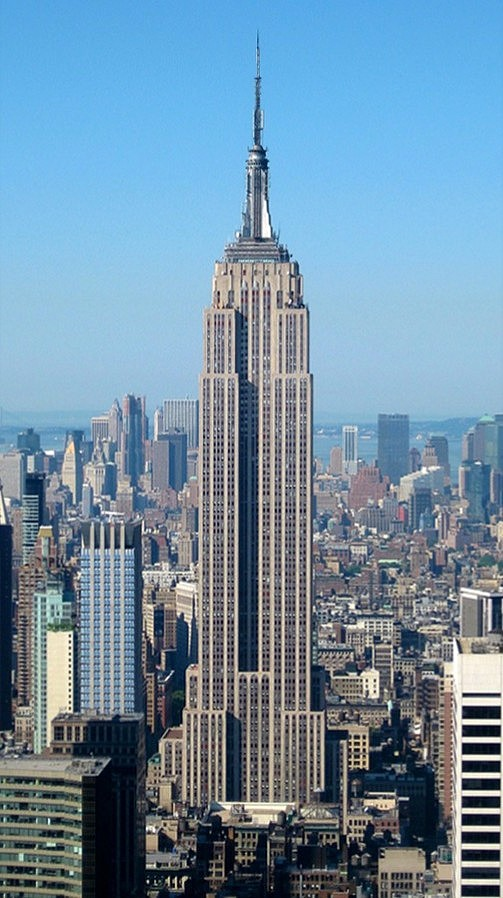
Empire State Building (1931), in New York City, global standard of reference for the height and length of other mega-structures

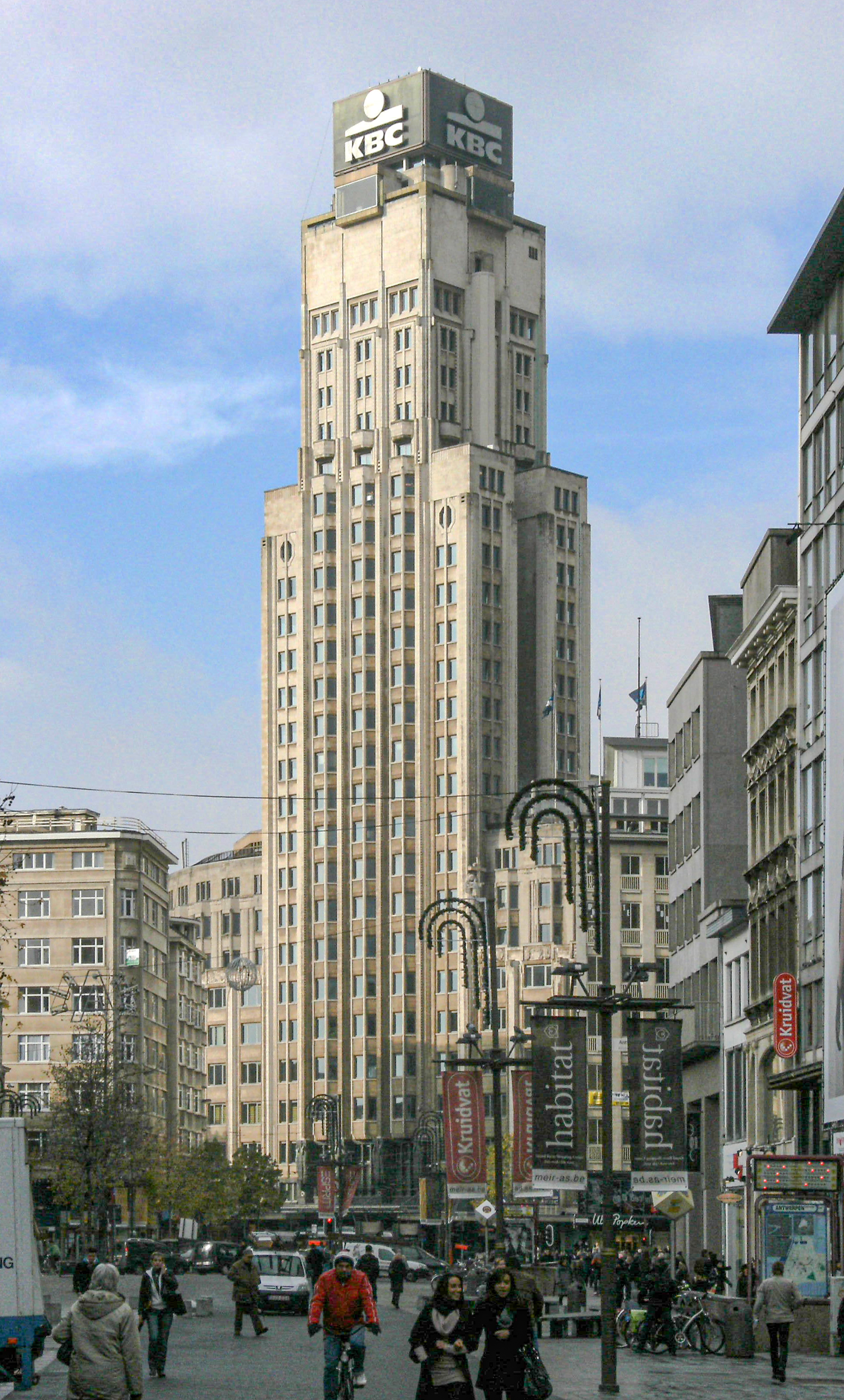
Boerentoren (1932), in Antwerp

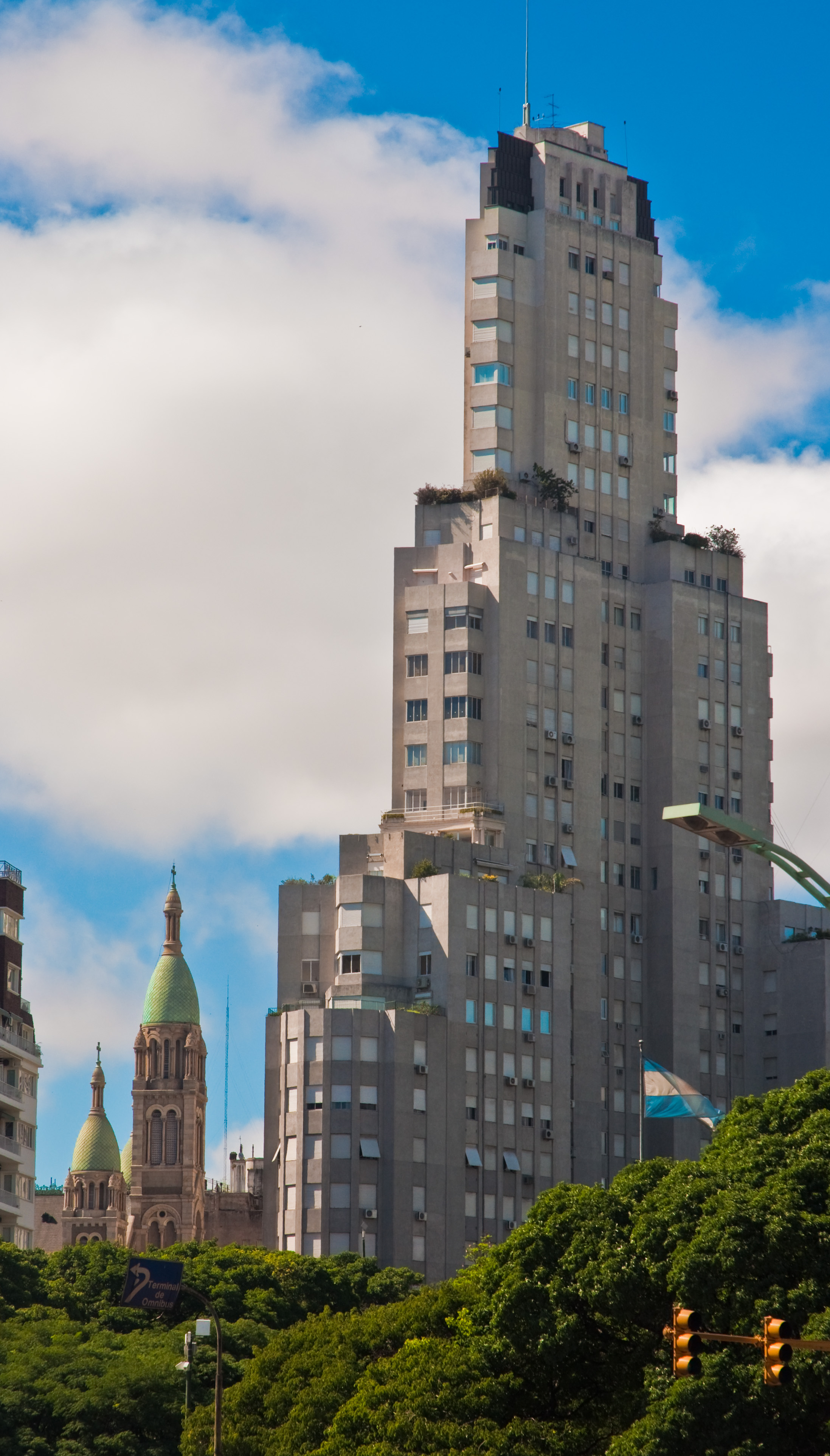
Edificio Kavanagh (1934), in Buenos Aires

Concerns about aesthetics and fire safety had likewise hampered the development of skyscrapers across continental Europe for the first half of the 20th century. By 1940, there were around 100 high-rise buildings in Europe (List of early skyscrapers). Some examples of these are the 43 m (141 ft) tall 1898 Witte Huis (White House) in Rotterdam; the 51.5 m (169 ft) tall PAST Building (1906–1908) in Warsaw; the Royal Liver Building in Liverpool, completed in 1911 and 90 m (300 ft) high; the 57 m (187 ft) tall 1924 Marx House in Düsseldorf, the 65 m (213 ft) tall Borsigturm in Berlin, built in 1924, the 65 m (213 ft) tall Hansahochhaus in Cologne, Germany, built in 1925; the 61 m (200 ft) Kungstornen (Kings' Towers) in Stockholm, Sweden, which were built 1924–25; the 77 m (253 ft) Ullsteinhaus in Berlin, Germany, built in 1927; the 89 m (292 ft) Edificio Telefónica in Madrid, Spain, built in 1929; the 87.5 m (287 ft) Boerentoren in Antwerp, Belgium, built in 1932; the 66 m (217 ft) Prudential Building in Warsaw, Poland, built in 1934; and the 108 m (354 ft) Torre Piacentini in Genoa, Italy, built in 1940.

After an early competition between New York City and Chicago for the world's tallest building, New York took the lead by 1895 with the completion of the 103 m (338 ft) tall American Surety Building, leaving New York with the title of the world's tallest building for many years. America by far produced the most skyscrapers in this period.

=== Modern skyscrapers ===
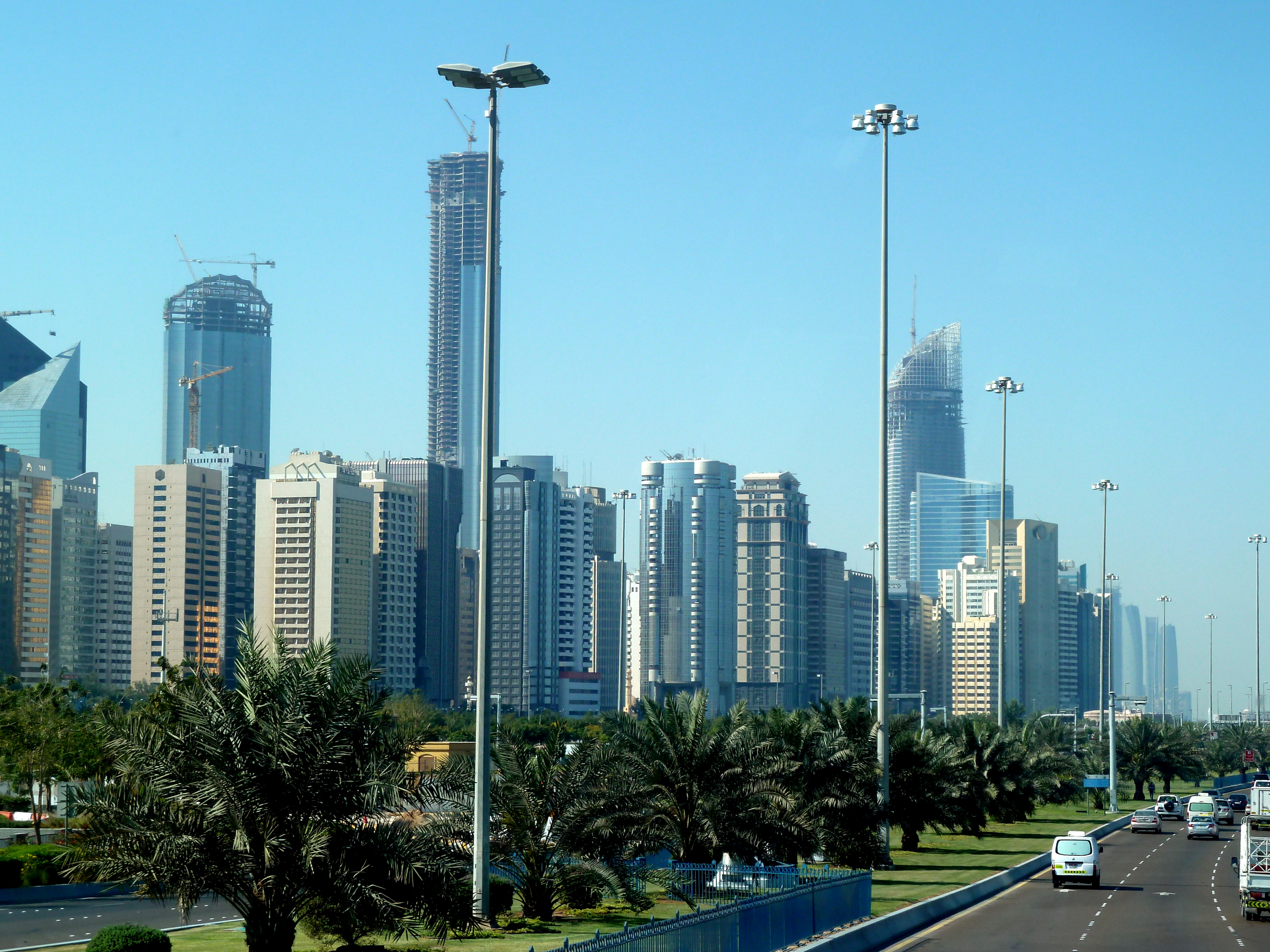
Skyscrapers and buildings in Abu Dhabi, Middle East

Modern skyscrapers are built with steel or reinforced concrete frameworks and curtain walls of glass or polished stone. They use mechanical equipment such as water pumps and elevators. Since the 1960s, according to the CTBUH (Council on Tall Buildings and Urban Habitat) the skyscraper has been reoriented away from a symbol for North American corporate power to instead communicate a city or nation's place in the world. Skyscrapers are a common feature in the downtown or central business districts (CBD) of major cities, especially in the Americas, Asia, and Australia, often due to a high demand for space and limited availability of land. Skyscrapers are a global phenomenon, present in over 70 countries. There are over seven thousand skyscrapers over 150 m (492 ft) in height worldwide, most of which were built in the 21st century.

Stalinist skyscrapers

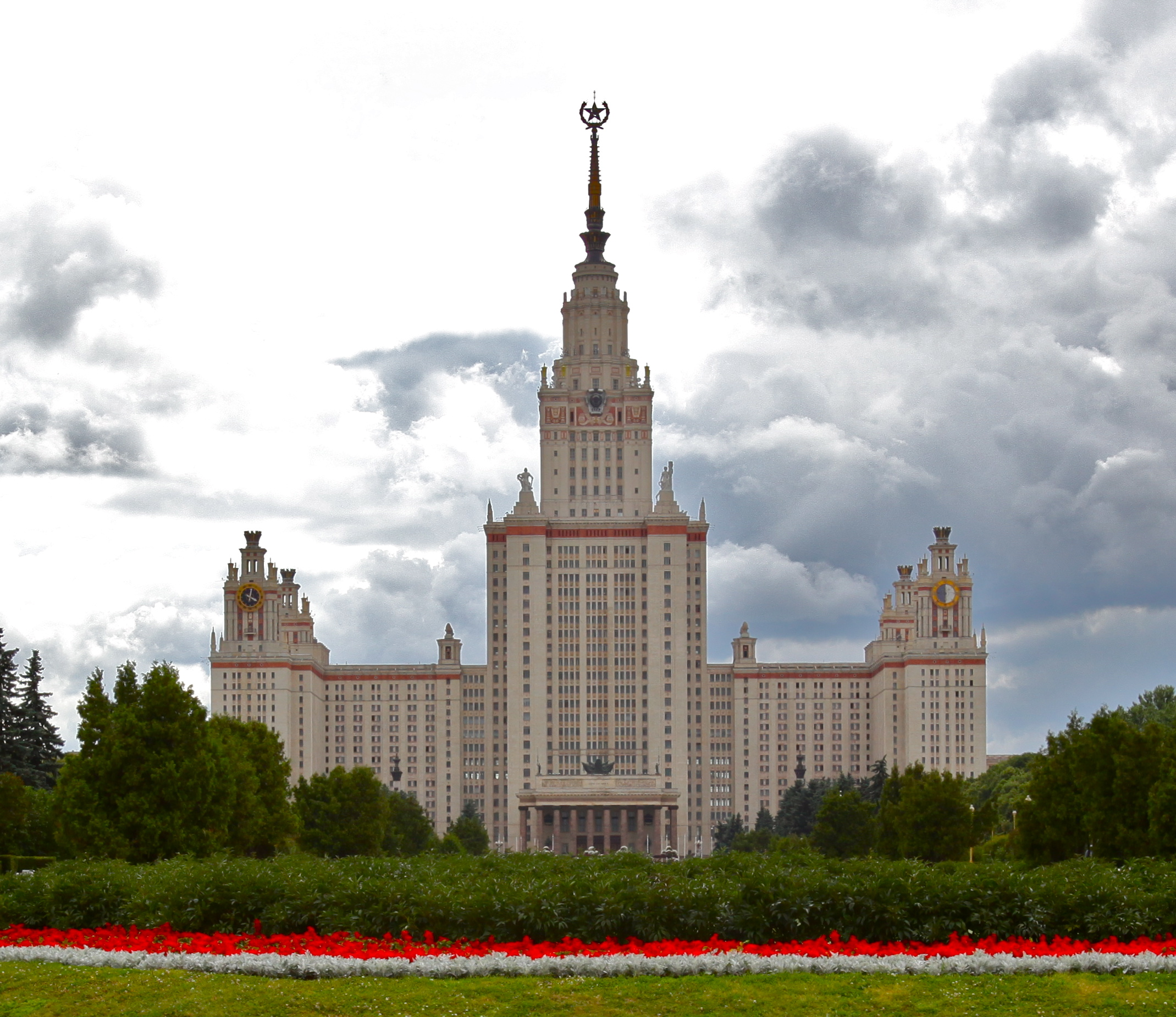
Main building of Moscow State University (1953), in Moscow

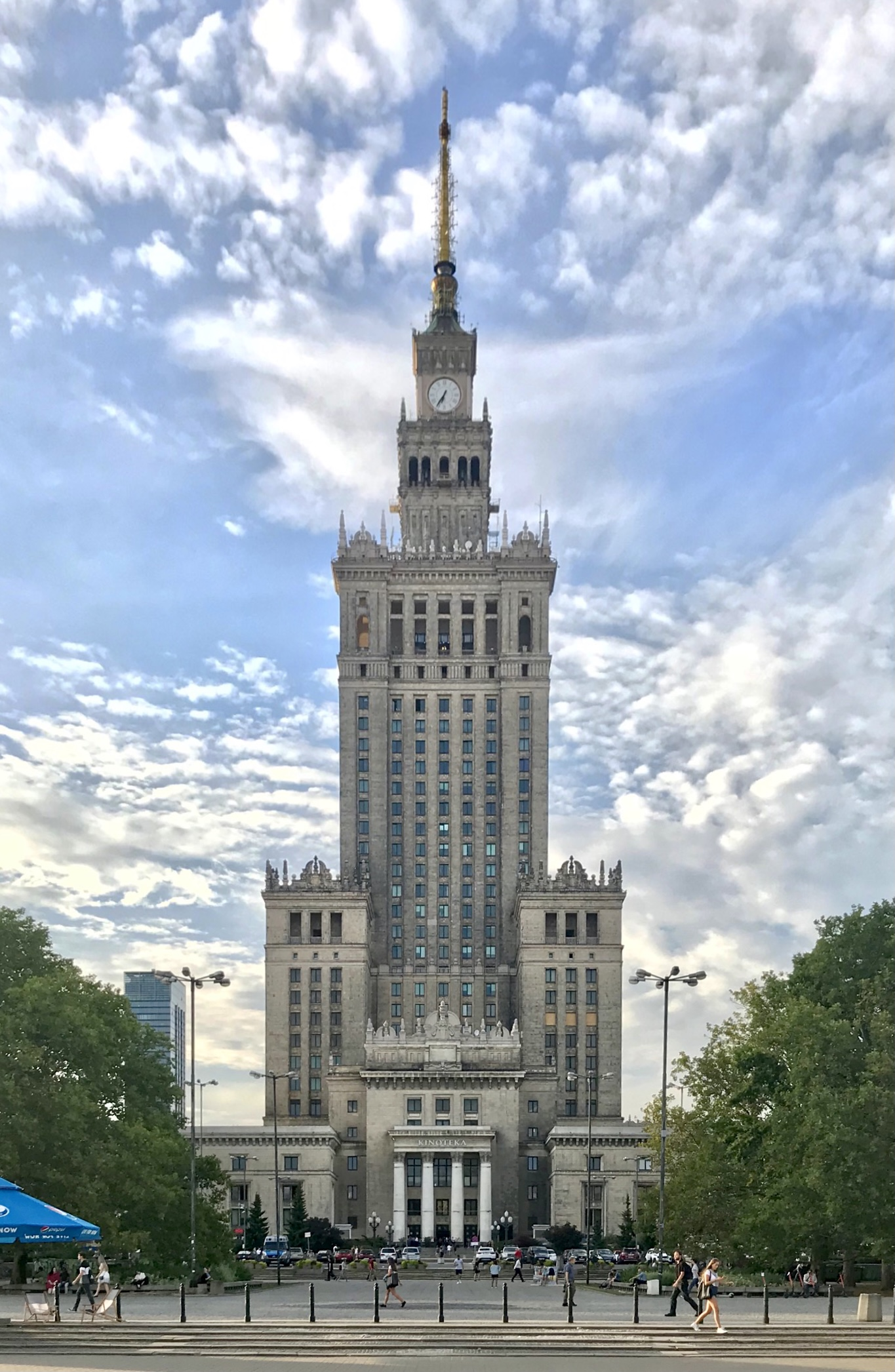
Palace of Culture and Science (1955), in Warsaw

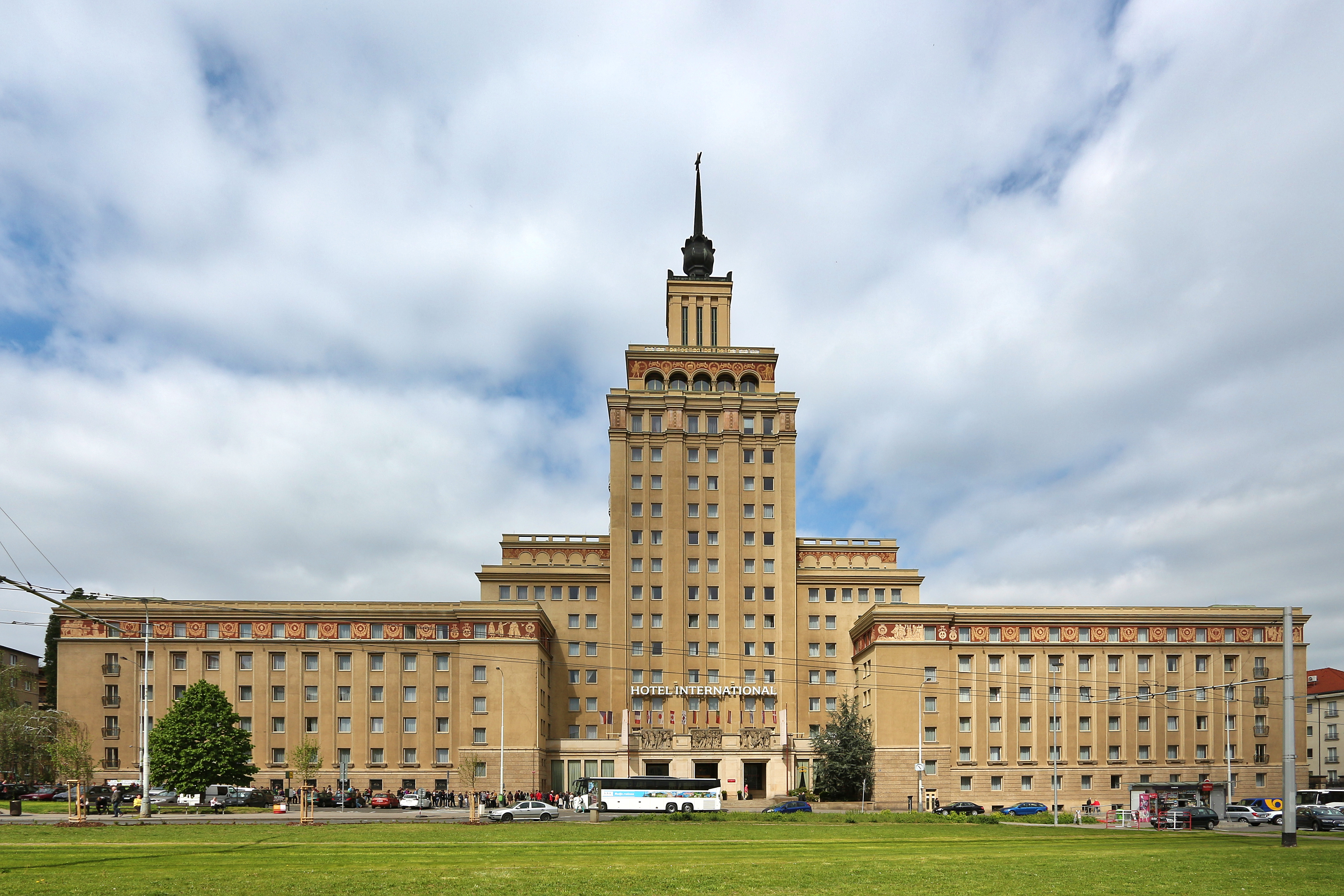
Grand Hotel International (1956), in Prague

The construction of very tall skyscrapers entered a three-decades-long era of stagnation in 1930 due to the Great Depression and then World War II. Shortly after the war ended, Russia began construction on a series of skyscrapers in Moscow. Seven, dubbed the "Seven Sisters", were built between 1947 and 1953; and one, the Main building of Moscow State University, was the tallest building in Europe for nearly four decades (1953–1990). Other skyscrapers in the style of Socialist Classicism were erected in East Germany (Frankfurter Tor), Poland (PKiN), Ukraine (Hotel Moscow), Latvia (Academy of Sciences), and other Eastern Bloc countries. Western European countries also began to permit taller skyscrapers during the years immediately following World War II. Early examples include Edificio España (Spain) and Torre Breda (Italy).

From the 1930s onward, skyscrapers began to appear in various cities in East and Southeast Asia as well as in Latin America. Finally, they also began to be constructed in cities in Africa, the Middle East, South Asia, and Oceania from the late 1950s.

Skyscraper projects after World War II typically rejected the classical designs of the early skyscrapers, instead embracing the uniform international style; many older skyscrapers were redesigned to suit contemporary tastes or even demolished—such as New York's Singer Building, once the world's tallest skyscraper.

German-American architect Ludwig Mies van der Rohe became one of the world's most renowned architects in the second half of the 20th century. He conceived the glass façade skyscraper and, along with Norwegian Fred Severud, designed the Seagram Building in 1958, a skyscraper that is often regarded as the pinnacle of modernist high-rise architecture.

Postwar modernist skyscrapers

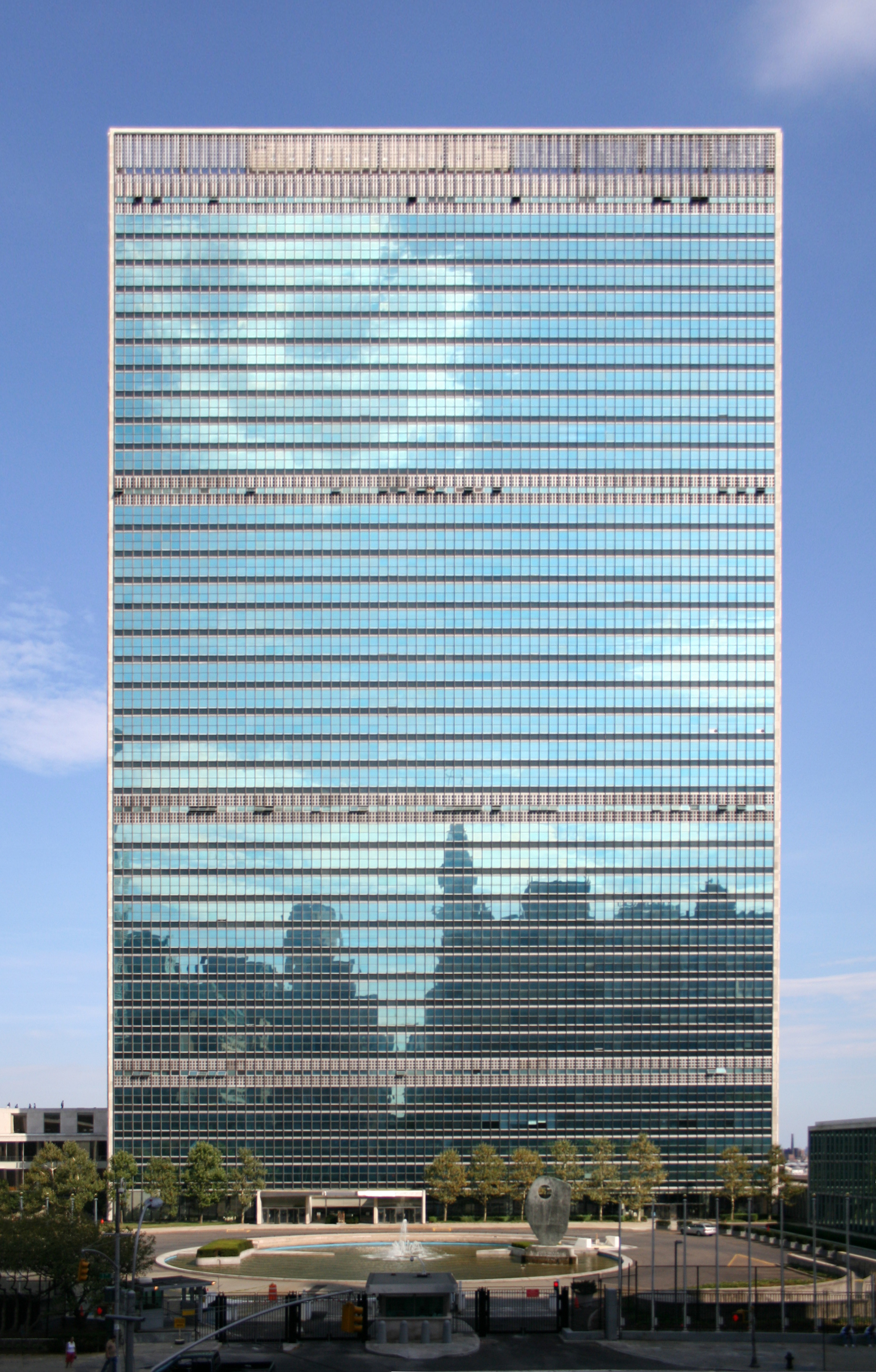
UN Secretariat Building (1952), in New York City

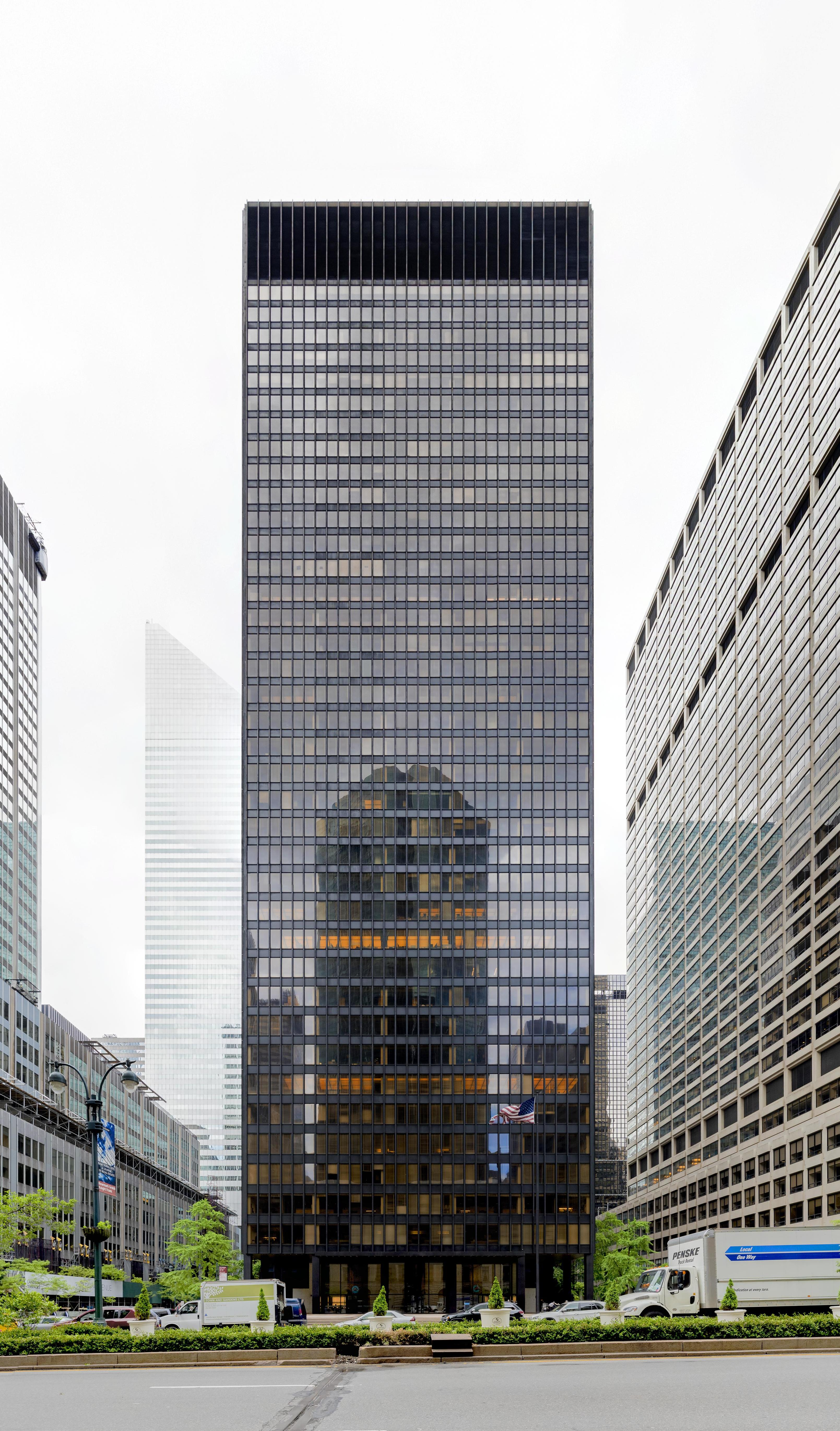
Seagram Building (1958), in New York City

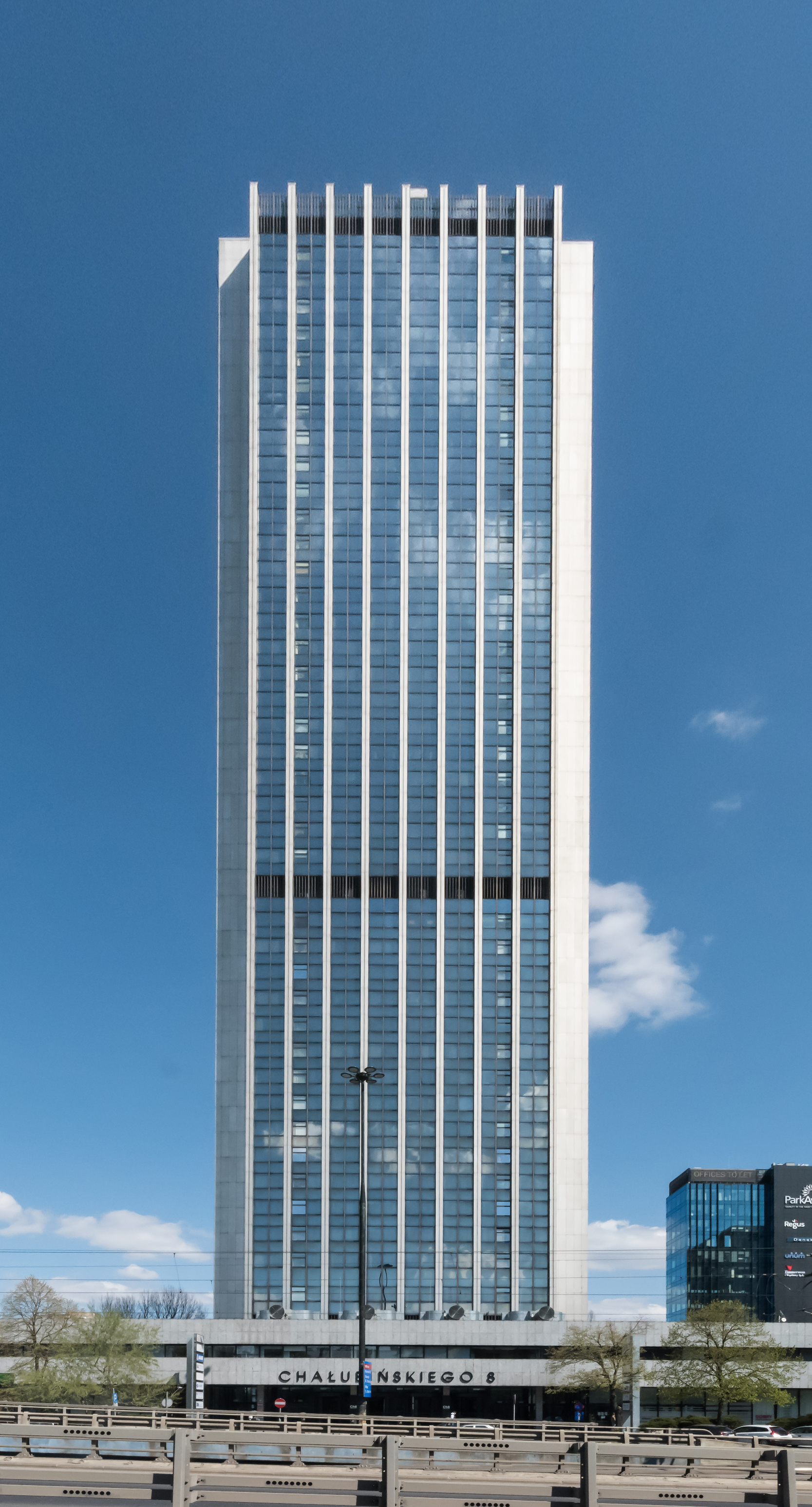
Chałubińskiego 8 (1978), in Warsaw

Skyscraper construction surged throughout the 1960s. The impetus behind the upswing was a series of transformative innovations which made it possible for people to live and work in "cities in the sky".

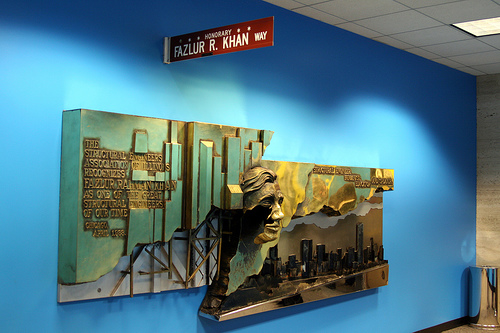
Sculpture honoring Fazlur Rahman Khan at the Willis Tower in Chicago. Khan made important advancements in skyscraper engineering.

In the early 1960s Bangladeshi-American structural engineer Fazlur Rahman Khan, considered the "father of tubular designs" for high-rises, discovered that the dominating rigid steel frame structure was not the only system apt for tall buildings, marking a new era of skyscraper construction in terms of multiple structural systems. His central innovation in skyscraper design and construction was the concept of the "tube" structural system, including the "framed tube", "trussed tube", and "bundled tube". His "tube concept", using all the exterior wall perimeter structure of a building to simulate a thin-walled tube, revolutionized tall building design. These systems allow greater economic efficiency, and also allow skyscrapers to take on various shapes, no longer needing to be rectangular and box-shaped. The first building to employ the tube structure was the Chestnut De-Witt apartment building, considered to be a major development in modern architecture. These new designs opened an economic door for contractors, engineers, architects, and investors, providing vast amounts of real estate space on minimal plots of land. Over the next fifteen years, many towers were built by Fazlur Rahman Khan and the "Second Chicago School", including the hundred-story John Hancock Center and the massive 442 m (1,450 ft) Willis Tower. Other pioneers of this field include Hal Iyengar, William LeMessurier, and Minoru Yamasaki, the architect of the World Trade Center.

Many buildings designed in the 1970s lacked a particular style and recalled ornamentation from earlier buildings designed before the 1950s. These design plans ignored the environment and loaded structures with decorative elements and extravagant finishes. This approach to design was opposed by Fazlur Khan and he considered the designs to be whimsical rather than rational. Moreover, he considered the work to be a waste of precious natural resources. Khan's work promoted structures integrated with architecture and the least use of material resulting in the smallest impact on the environment. The next era of skyscrapers will focus on the environment including performance of structures, types of material, construction practices, absolute minimal use of materials/natural resources, embodied energy within the structures, and more importantly, a holistically integrated building systems approach.

Postmodern skyscrapers

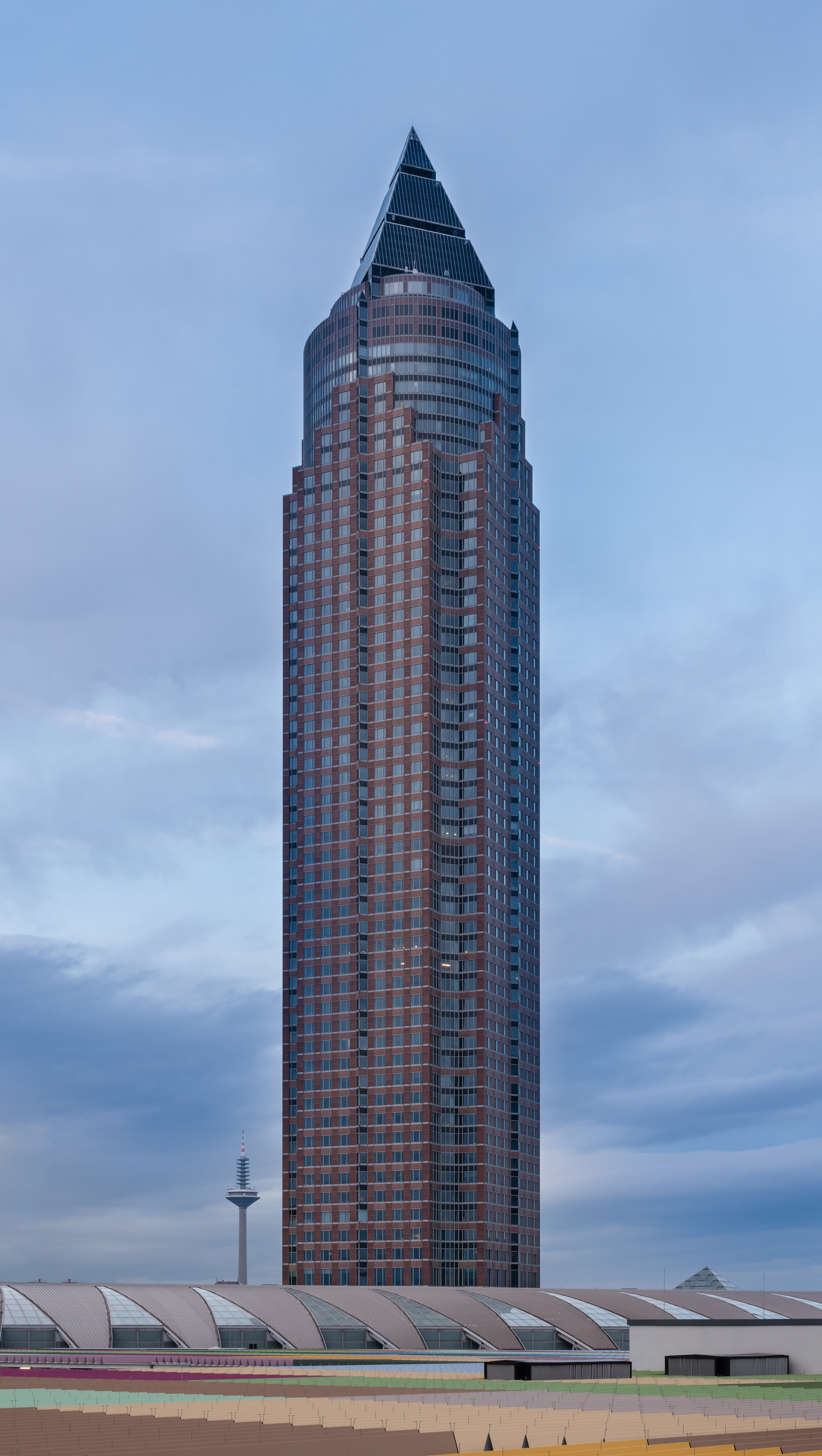
Messeturm (1990), in Frankfurt

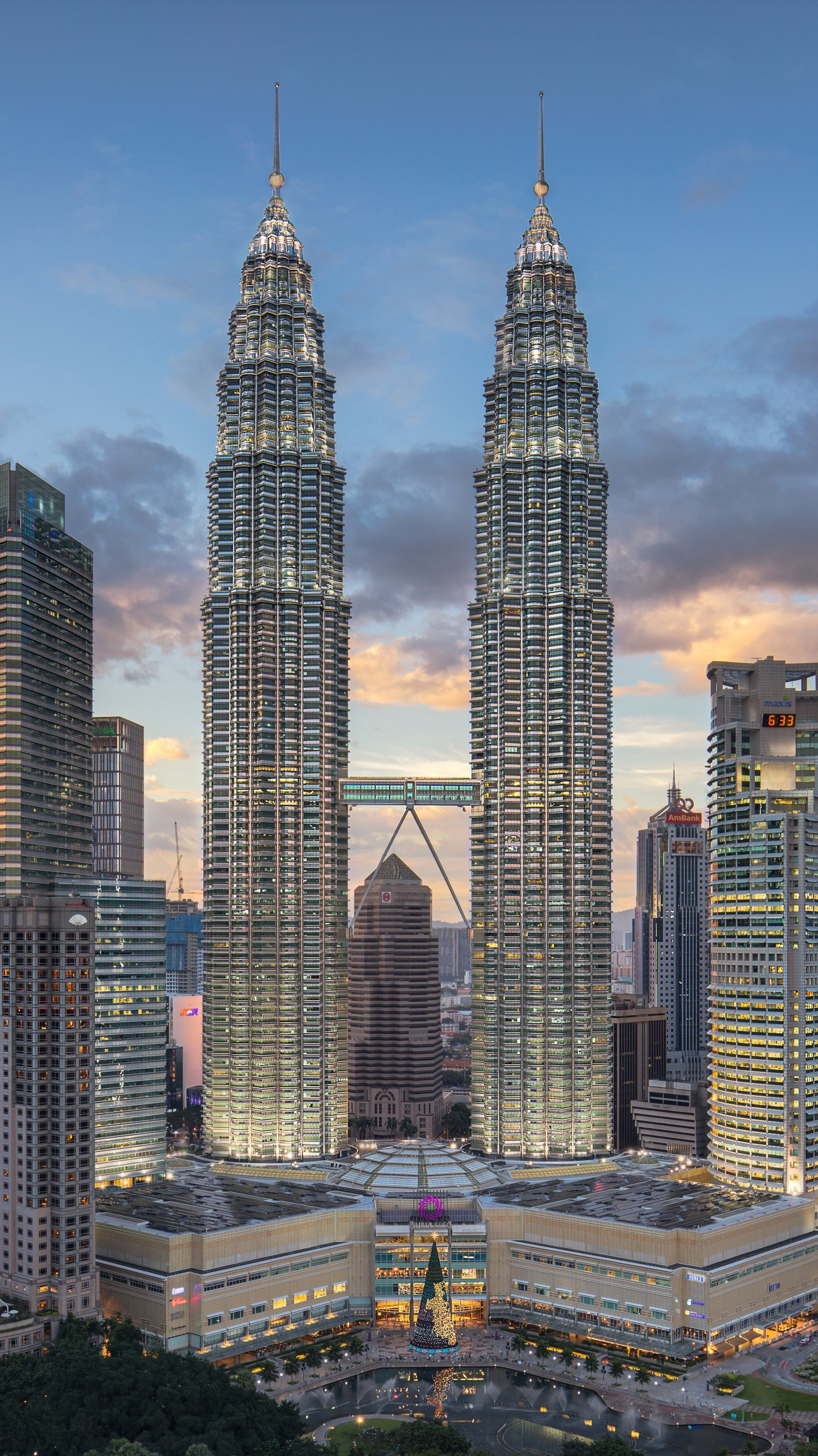
Petronas Towers (1998), in Kuala Lumpur

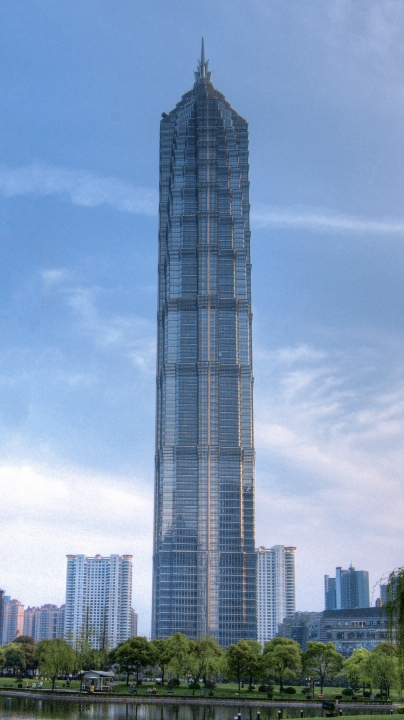
Jin Mao Tower (1999), in Shanghai

Modern building practices regarding supertall structures have led to the study of "vanity height". Vanity height, according to the CTBUH, is the distance between the highest floor and its architectural top (excluding antennae, flagpole or other functional extensions). Vanity height first appeared in New York City skyscrapers as early as the 1920s and 1930s but supertall buildings have relied on such uninhabitable extensions for on average 30% of their height, raising potential definitional and sustainability issues. The current era of skyscrapers focuses on sustainability, its built and natural environments, including the performance of structures, types of materials, construction practices, absolute minimal use of materials and natural resources, energy within the structure, and a holistically integrated building systems approach. LEED is a current green building standard.

Architecturally, with the movements of Postmodernism, New Urbanism and New Classical Architecture, that established since the 1980s, a more classical approach came back to global skyscraper design, that remains popular today. Examples are the Wells Fargo Center, NBC Tower, Parkview Square, 30 Park Place, the Messeturm, the iconic Petronas Towers and Jin Mao Tower.

Contemporary skyscrapers

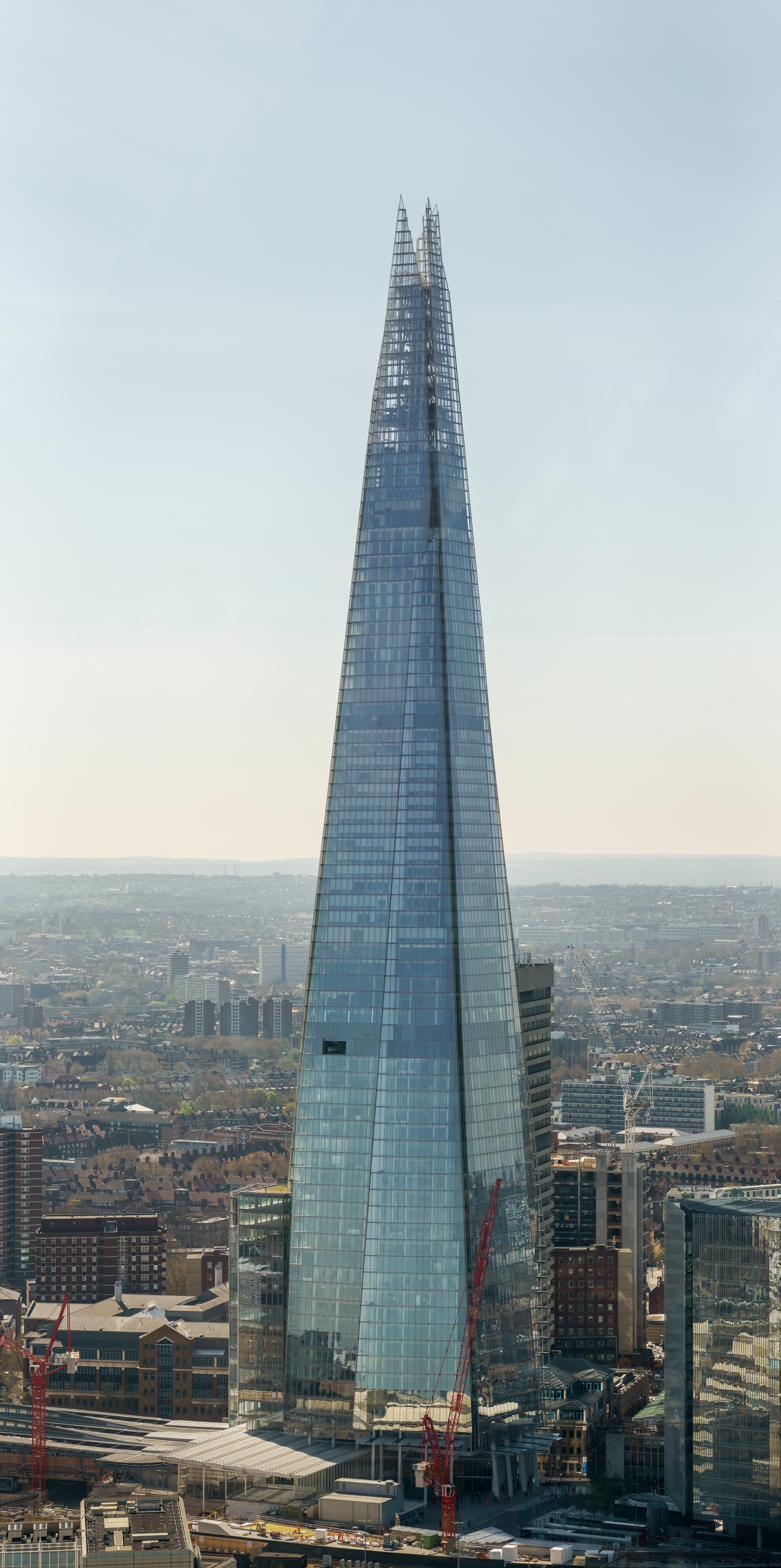
The Shard (2012), in London

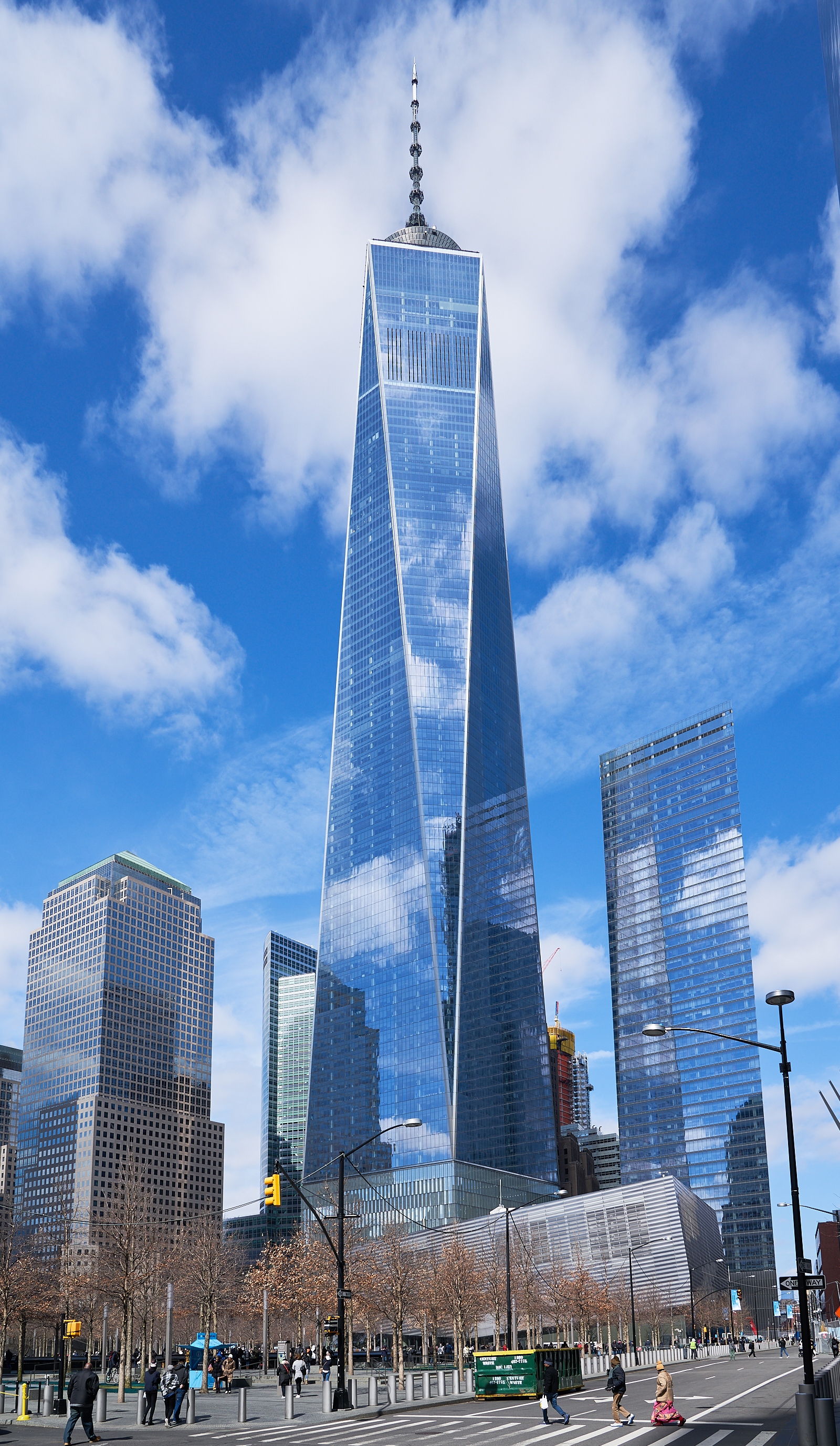
One World Trade Center (2013), in New York City

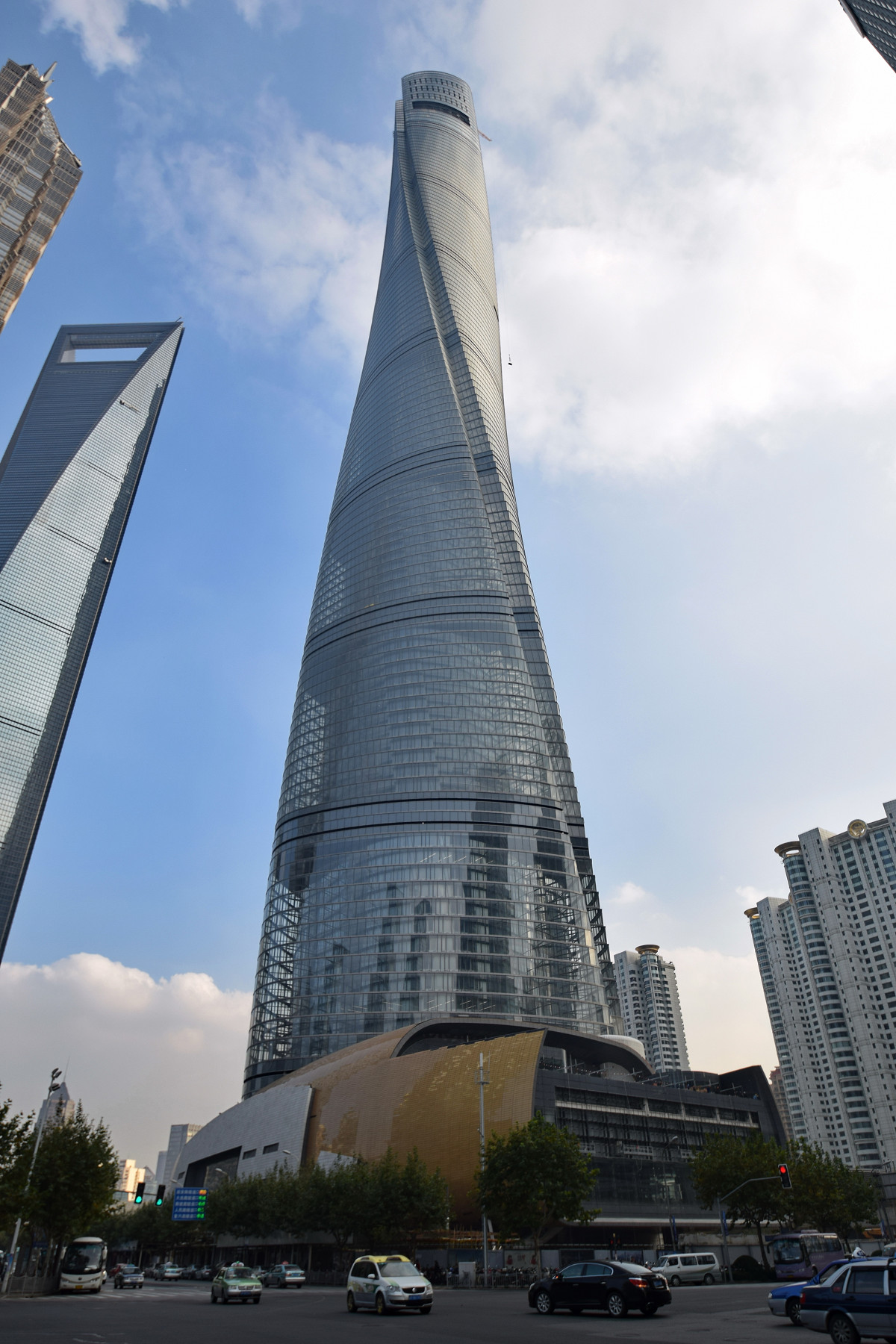
Shanghai Tower (2014), in Shanghai

Other contemporary styles and movements in skyscraper design include organic, sustainable, neo-futurist, structuralist, high-tech, deconstructivist, blob, digital, streamline, novelty, critical regionalist, vernacular, Neo Art Deco and neohistorist, also known as revivalist.

3 September is the global commemorative day for skyscrapers, called "Skyscraper Day".

New York City developers competed among themselves, with successively taller buildings claiming the title of "world's tallest" in the 1920s and early 1930s, culminating with the completion of the 318.9 m (1,046 ft) Chrysler Building in 1930 and the 443.2 m (1,454 ft) Empire State Building in 1931, the world's tallest building for forty years. The first completed 417 m (1,368 ft) tall World Trade Center tower became the world's tallest building in 1972. However, it was overtaken by the Sears Tower (now Willis Tower) in Chicago within two years. The 442 m (1,450 ft) tall Sears Tower stood as the world's tallest building for 24 years, from 1974 until 1998, until it was edged out by 452 m (1,483 ft) Petronas Twin Towers in Kuala Lumpur, which held the title for six years.

== Design and construction ==
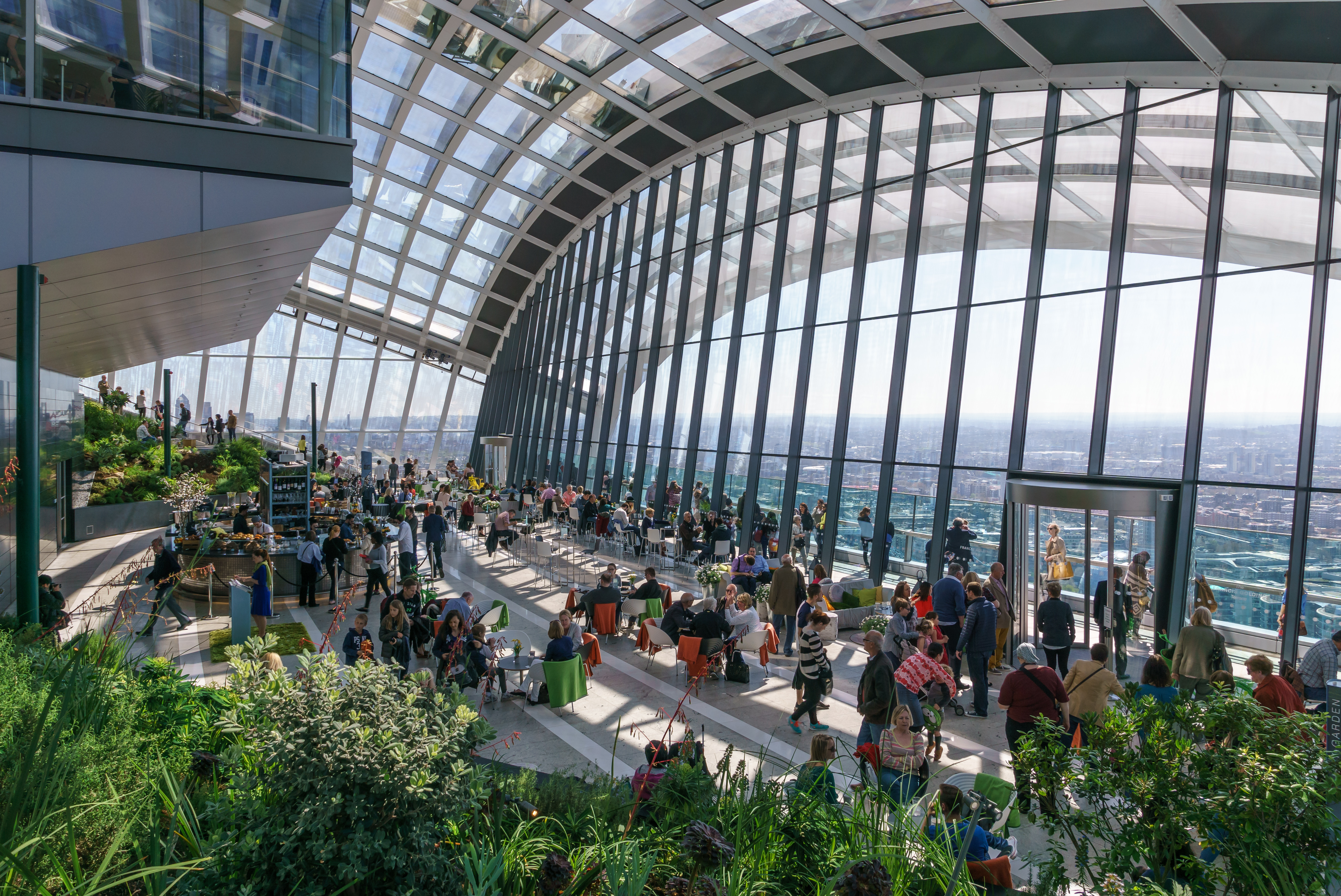
The Sky Garden in London's 20 Fenchurch Street is an example of where top floors are used as restaurants or viewing areas, and in this case, both.

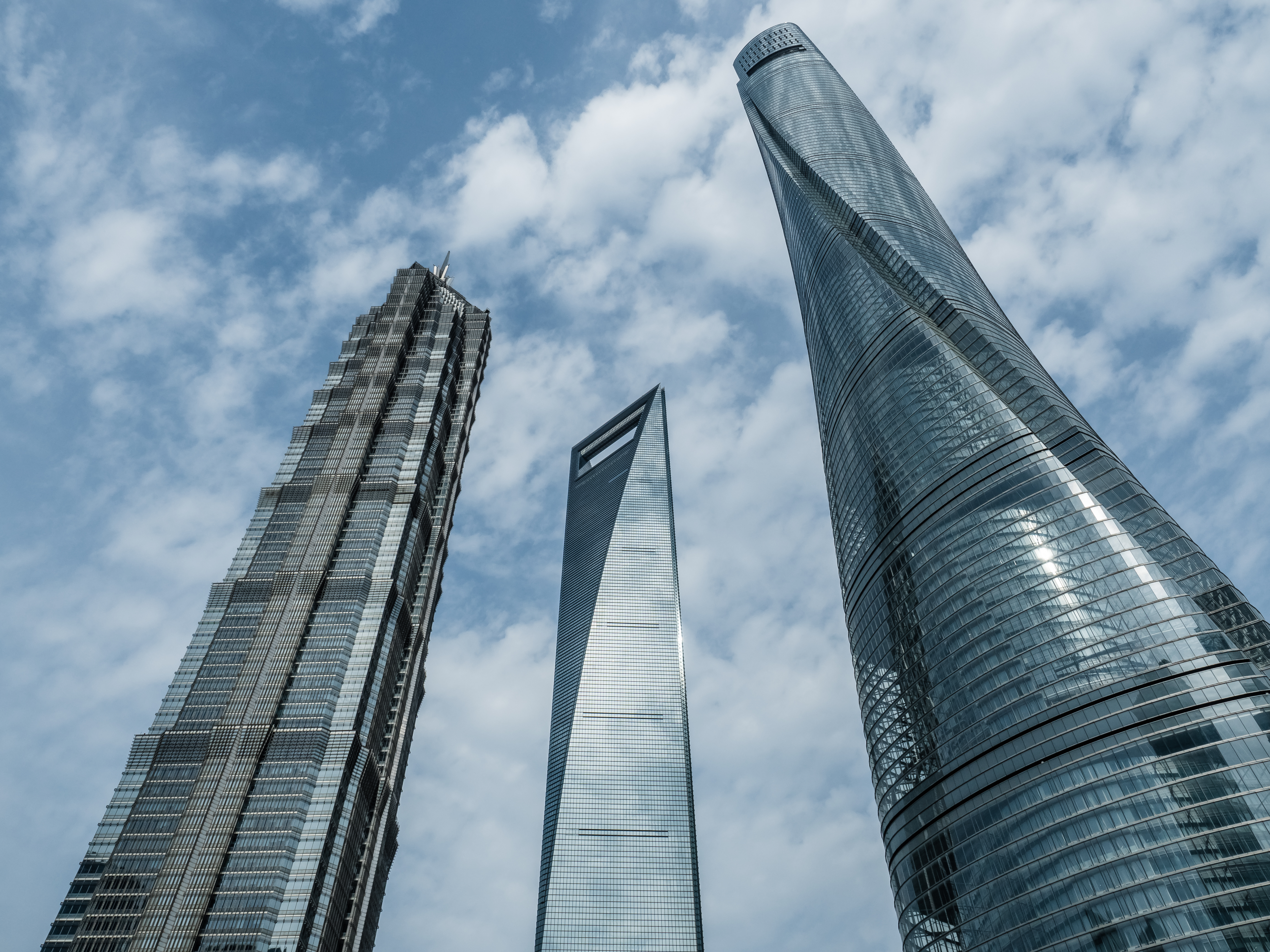
Contemporary skyscrapers in Shanghai

The design and construction of skyscrapers involves creating safe, habitable spaces in very tall buildings. The buildings must support their weight, resist wind and earthquakes, and protect occupants from fire. Yet they must also be conveniently accessible, even on the upper floors, and provide utilities and a comfortable climate for the occupants. The problems posed in skyscraper design are considered among the most complex encountered given the balances required between economics, engineering, and construction management.

One common feature of skyscrapers is a steel framework from which curtain walls are suspended, rather than load-bearing walls of conventional construction. Most skyscrapers have a steel frame that enables them to be built taller than typical load-bearing walls of reinforced concrete. Skyscrapers usually have a particularly small surface area of what are conventionally thought of as walls. Because the walls are not load-bearing most skyscrapers are characterized by surface areas of windows made possible by the concept of steel frame and curtain wall. However, skyscrapers can also have curtain walls that mimic conventional walls and have a small surface area of windows.

The concept of a skyscraper is a product of the industrialized age, made possible by cheap fossil fuel derived energy and industrially refined raw materials such as steel and concrete. The construction of skyscrapers was enabled by steel frame construction that surpassed brick and mortar construction starting at the end of the 19th century and finally surpassing it in the 20th century together with reinforced concrete construction as the price of steel decreased and labor costs increased.

The steel frames become inefficient and uneconomic for supertall buildings as usable floor space is reduced for progressively larger supporting columns. Since about 1960, tubular designs have been used for high rises. This reduces the usage of material (more efficient in economic terms – Willis Tower uses a third less steel than the Empire State Building) yet allows greater height. It allows fewer interior columns, and so creates more usable floor space. It further enables buildings to take on various shapes.

Elevators are characteristic to skyscrapers. In 1852 Elisha Otis introduced the safety elevator, allowing convenient and safe passenger movement to upper floors. Today major manufacturers of elevators include Otis, ThyssenKrupp, Schindler, and KONE.

Advances in construction techniques have allowed skyscrapers to narrow in width, while increasing in height. Some of these new techniques include mass dampers to reduce vibrations and swaying, and gaps to allow air to pass through, reducing wind shear.

=== Basic design considerations ===
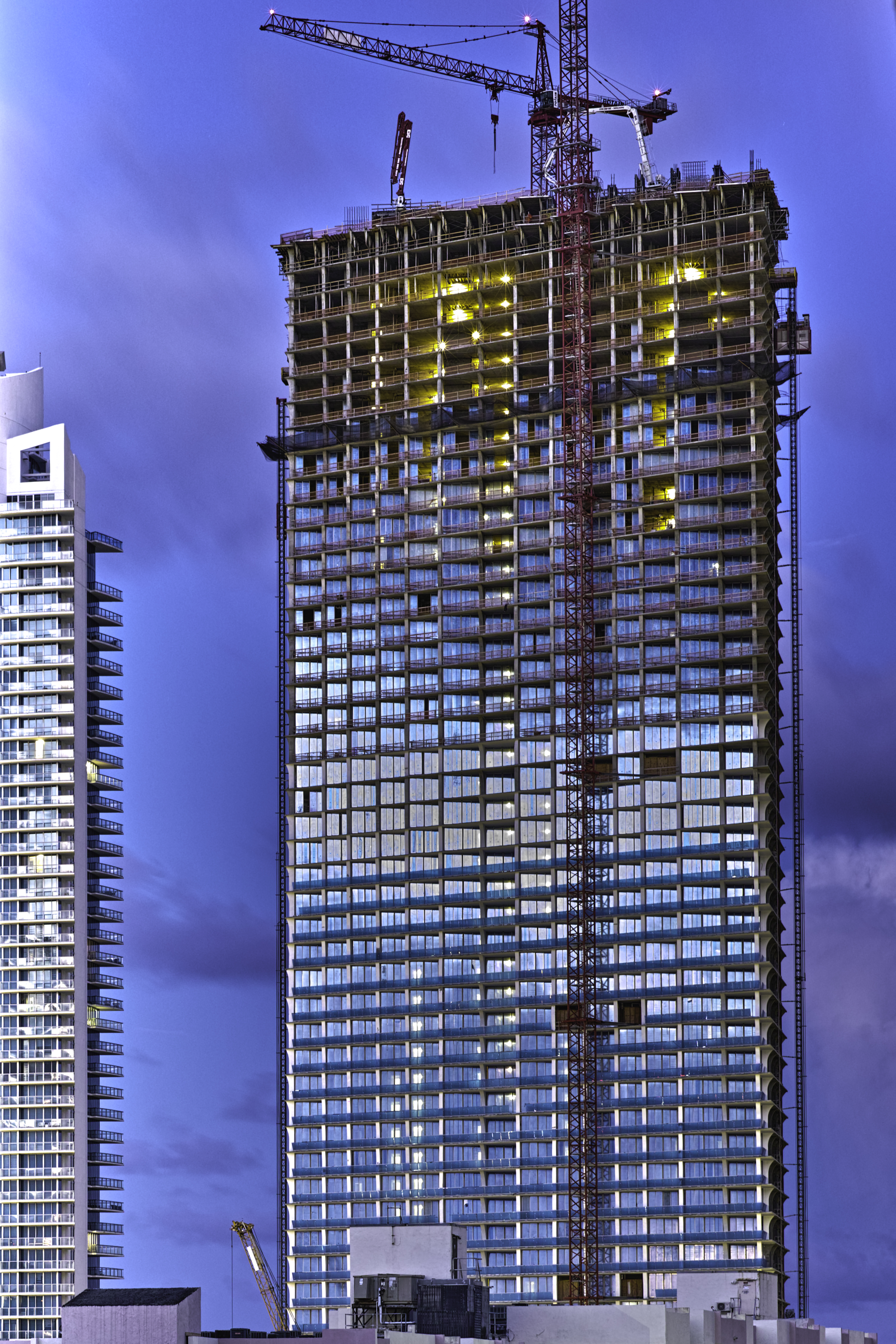
A view of the interior structural design can be seen in this residential skyscraper that was constructed in Florida, the Jade Signature.

Good structural design is important in most building design, but particularly for skyscrapers since even a small chance of catastrophic failure is unacceptable given the tremendous damage such failure would cause. This presents a paradox to civil engineers: the only way to assure a lack of failure is to test for all modes of failure, in both the laboratory and the real world. But the only way to know of all modes of failure is to learn from previous failures. Thus, no engineer can be absolutely sure that a given structure will resist all loadings that could cause failure; instead, one can only have large enough margins of safety such that a failure is acceptably unlikely. When buildings do fail, engineers question whether the failure was due to some lack of foresight or due to some unknown factor.

=== Loading and vibration ===
The load a skyscraper experiences is largely from the force of the building material itself. In most building designs, the weight of the structure is much larger than the weight of the material that it will support beyond its own weight. In technical terms, the dead load, the load of the structure, is larger than the live load, the weight of things in the structure (people, furniture, vehicles, etc.). As such, the amount of structural material required within the lower levels of a skyscraper will be much larger than the material required within higher levels. This is not always visually apparent. The Empire State Building's setbacks are actually a result of the building code at the time (1916 Zoning Resolution), and were not structurally required. On the other hand, John Hancock Center's shape is uniquely the result of how it supports loads. Vertical supports can come in several types, among which the most common for skyscrapers can be categorized as steel frames, concrete cores, tube within tube design, and shear walls.

The wind loading on a skyscraper is also considerable. In fact, the lateral wind load imposed on supertall structures is generally the governing factor in the structural design. Wind pressure increases with height, so for very tall buildings, the loads associated with wind are larger than dead or live loads.

Other vertical and horizontal loading factors come from varied, unpredictable sources, such as earthquakes.

=== Steel frame ===
By 1895, steel had replaced cast iron as skyscrapers' structural material. Its malleability allowed it to be formed into a variety of shapes, and it could be riveted, ensuring strong connections. The simplicity of a steel frame eliminated the inefficient part of a shear wall, the central portion, and consolidated support members in a much stronger fashion by allowing both horizontal and vertical supports throughout. Among steel's drawbacks is that as more material must be supported as height increases, the distance between supporting members must decrease, which in turn increases the amount of material that must be supported. This becomes inefficient and uneconomic for buildings above 40 stories tall as usable floor spaces are reduced for supporting column and due to more usage of steel.

=== Tube structural systems ===
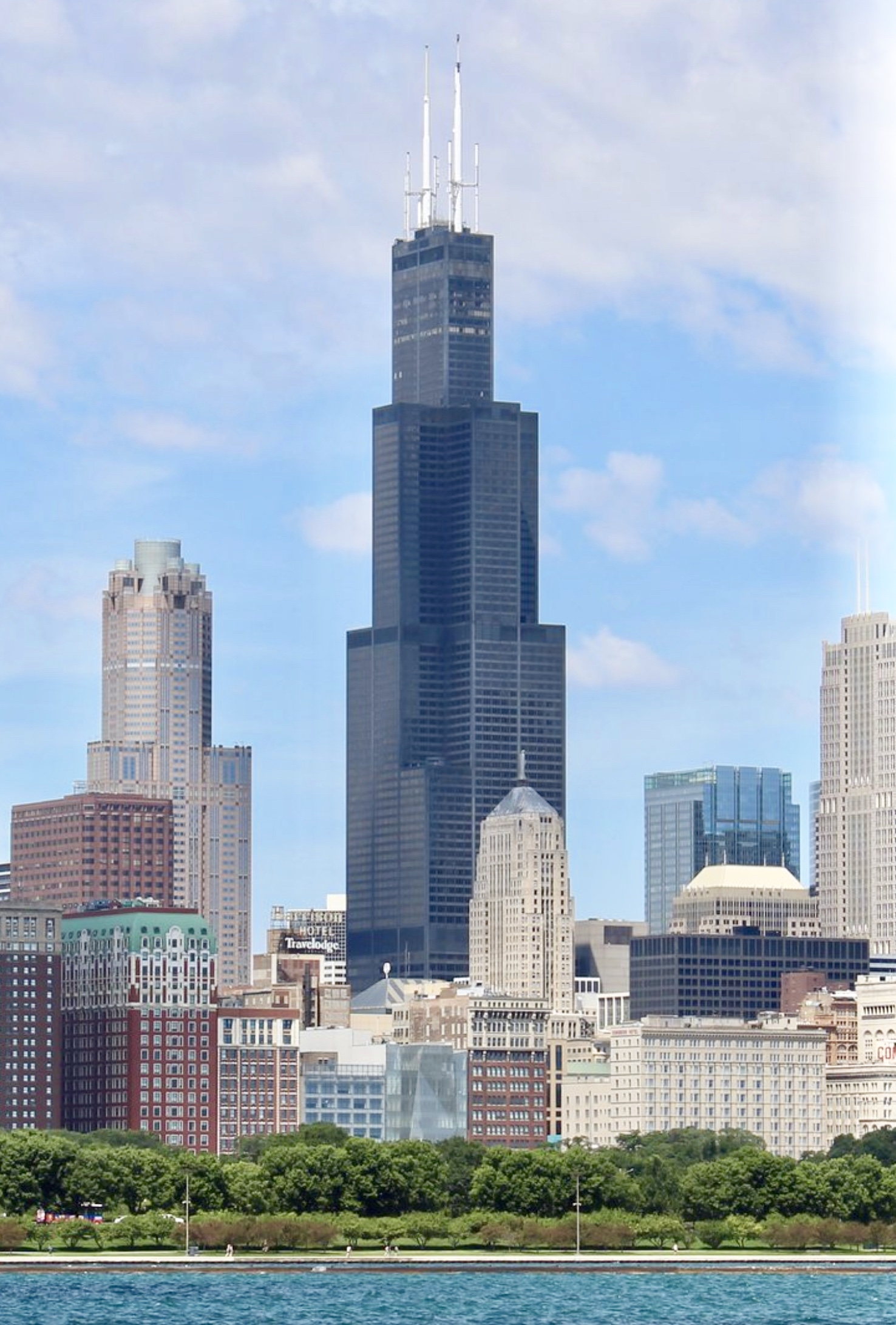
The Willis Tower in Chicago visibly expresses the bundled tube frame. Tube frame variations are commonly used in tall modern skyscapers.

A new structural system of framed tubes was developed by Fazlur Rahman Khan in 1963. The framed tube structure is defined as "a three dimensional space structure composed of three, four, or possibly more frames, braced frames, or shear walls, joined at or near their edges to form a vertical tube-like structural system capable of resisting lateral forces in any direction by cantilevering from the foundation". Closely spaced interconnected exterior columns form the tube. Horizontal loads (primarily wind) are supported by the structure as a whole. Framed tubes allow fewer interior columns, and so create more usable floor space, and about half the exterior surface is available for windows. Where larger openings like garage doors are required, the tube frame must be interrupted, with transfer girders used to maintain structural integrity. Tube structures cut down costs, at the same time allowing buildings to reach greater heights. Concrete tube-frame construction was first used in the DeWitt-Chestnut Apartment Building, completed in Chicago in 1963, and soon after in the John Hancock Center and World Trade Center.

The tubular systems are fundamental to tall building design. Most buildings over 40 stories constructed since the 1960s now use a tube design derived from Khan's structural engineering principles, examples including the construction of the World Trade Center, Aon Center, Petronas Towers, Jin Mao Building, and most other supertall skyscrapers since the 1960s. The strong influence of tube structure design is also evident in the construction of the current tallest skyscraper, the Burj Khalifa, which uses a Buttressed core.

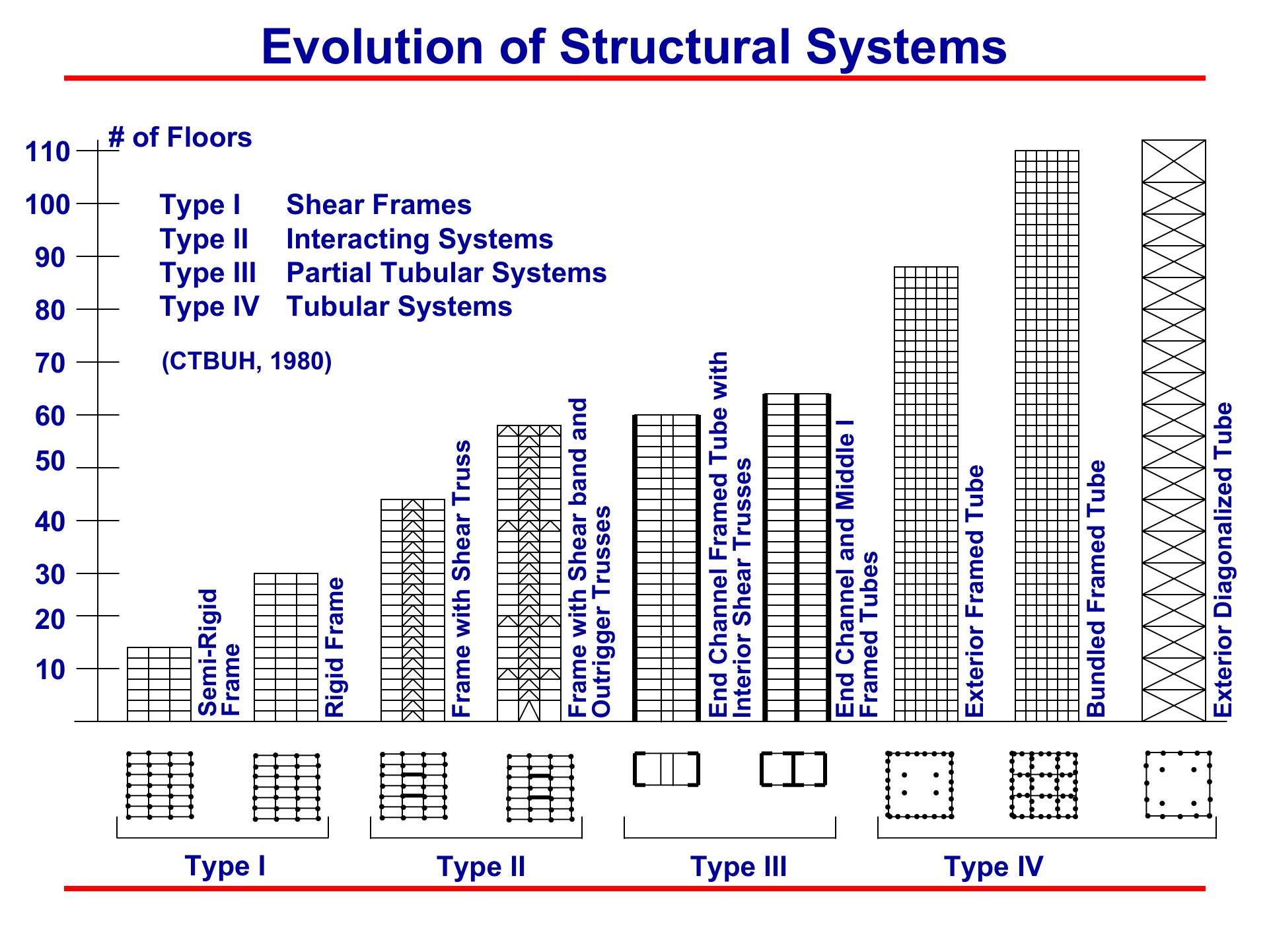
Changes of structure with height; the tubular systems are fundamental for supertall buildings.

Trussed tube and X-bracing
Khan pioneered several other variations of the tube structure design. One of these was the concept of X-bracing, or the trussed tube, first employed for the John Hancock Center. This concept reduced the lateral load on the building by transferring the load into the exterior columns. This allows for a reduced need for interior columns thus creating more floor space. This concept can be seen in the John Hancock Center, designed in 1965 and completed in 1969. One of the most famous buildings of the structural expressionist style, the skyscraper's distinctive X-bracing exterior is actually a hint that the structure's skin is indeed part of its 'tubular system'. This idea is one of the architectural techniques the building used to climb to record heights (the tubular system is essentially the spine that helps the building stand upright during wind and earthquake loads). This X-bracing allows for both higher performance from tall structures and the ability to open up the inside floorplan (and usable floor space) if the architect desires.
The John Hancock Center was far more efficient than earlier steel-frame structures. Where the Empire State Building (1931), required about 206 kilograms of steel per square metre and 28 Liberty Street (1961) required 275, the John Hancock Center required only 145. The trussed tube concept was applied to many later skyscrapers, including the Onterie Center, Citigroup Center and Bank of China Tower.

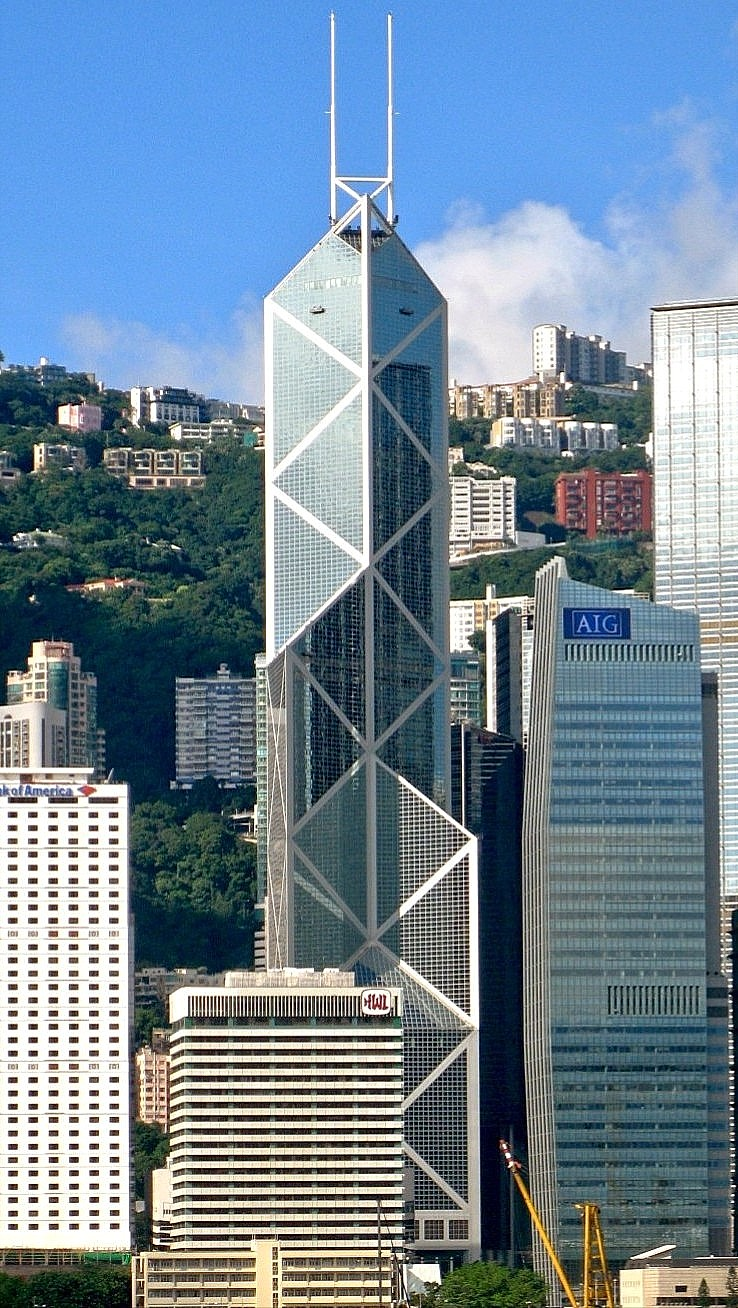
The Bank of China Tower in Hong Kong uses a trussed tube design

Bundled tube
An important variation on the tube frame is the bundled tube, which uses several interconnected tube frames. The Willis Tower in Chicago used this design, employing nine tubes of varying height to achieve its distinct appearance. The bundled tube structure meant that "buildings no longer need be boxlike in appearance: they could become sculpture."
Tube in tube
Tube-in-tube system takes advantage of core shear wall tubes in addition to exterior tubes. The inner tube and outer tube work together to resist gravity loads and lateral loads and to provide additional rigidity to the structure to prevent significant deflections at the top. This design was first used in One Shell Plaza. Later buildings to use this structural system include the Petronas Towers.
Outrigger and belt truss
The outrigger and belt truss system is a lateral load resisting system in which the tube structure is connected to the central core wall with very stiff outriggers and belt trusses at one or more levels. BHP House was the first building to use this structural system followed by the First Wisconsin Center, since renamed U.S. Bank Center, in Milwaukee. The center rises 601 feet, with three belt trusses at the bottom, middle and top of the building. The exposed belt trusses serve aesthetic and structural purposes. Later buildings to use this include Shanghai World Financial Center.
Concrete tube structures
The last major buildings engineered by Khan were the One Magnificent Mile and Onterie Center in Chicago, which employed his bundled tube and trussed tube system designs respectively. In contrast to his earlier buildings, which were mainly steel, his last two buildings were concrete. His earlier DeWitt-Chestnut Apartments building, built in 1963 in Chicago, was also a concrete building with a tube structure. Trump Tower in New York City is also another example that adapted this system.

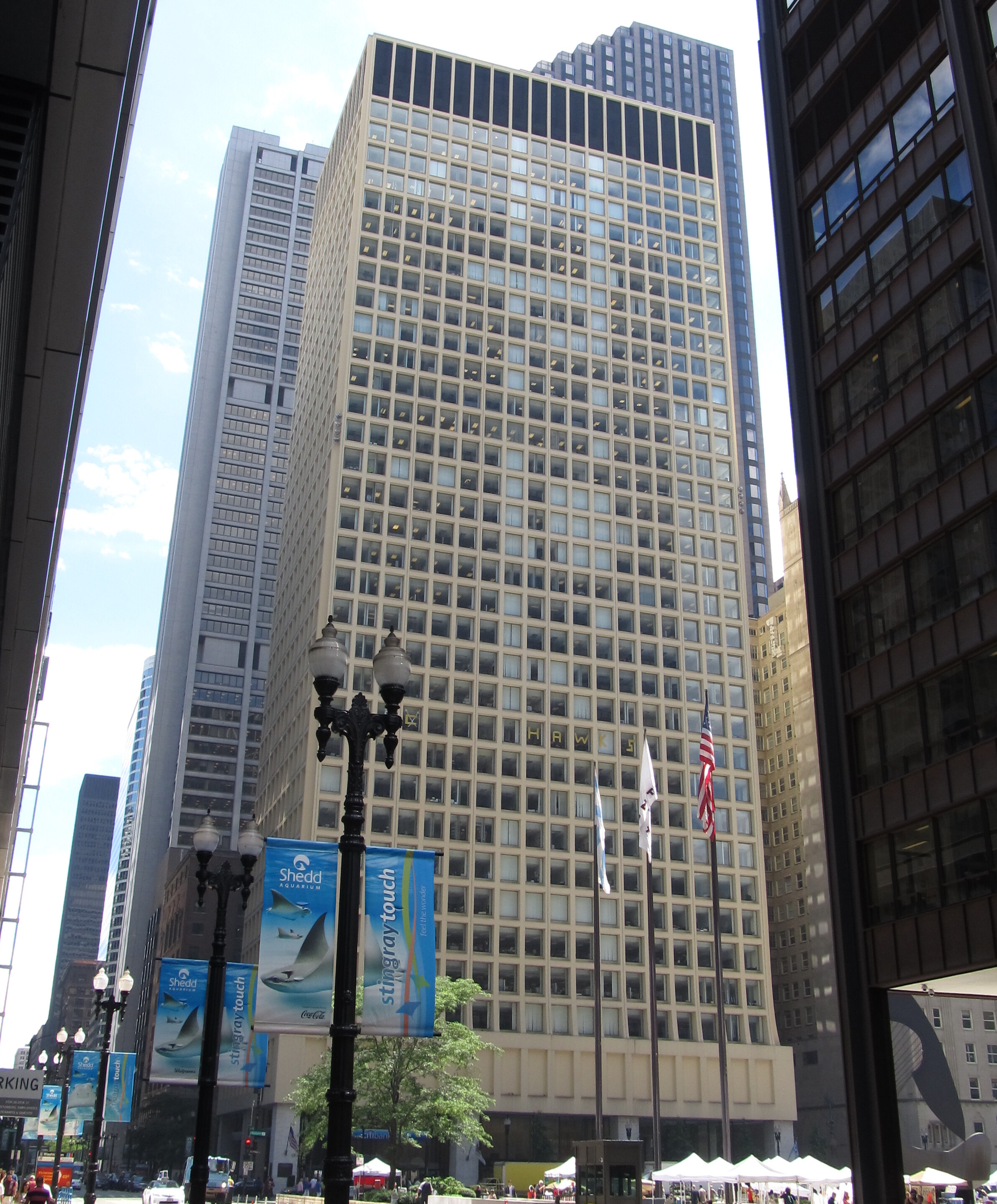
The Cook County Administration Building in Chicago was the first to utilize a shear wall frame interaction system

Shear wall frame interaction system: Khan developed the shear wall frame interaction system for mid high-rise buildings. This structural system uses combinations of shear walls and frames designed to resist lateral forces. The first building to use this structural system was the 35-stories Brunswick Building. The Brunswick building (today known as the "Cook County Administration Building") was completed in 1965 and became the tallest reinforced concrete structure of its time. The structural system of Brunswick Building consists of a concrete shear wall core surrounded by an outer concrete frame of columns and spandrels. Apartment buildings up to 70 stories high have successfully used this concept.

=== The elevator conundrum ===
The invention of the elevator was a precondition for the invention of skyscrapers, given that most people would not (or could not) climb more than a few flights of stairs at a time. The elevators in a skyscraper are not simply a necessary utility, like running water and electricity, but are in fact closely related to the design of the whole structure: a taller building requires more elevators to service the additional floors, but the elevator shafts consume valuable floor space. If the service core, which contains the elevator shafts, becomes too big, it can reduce the profitability of the building. Architects must therefore balance the value gained by adding height against the value lost to the expanding service core.

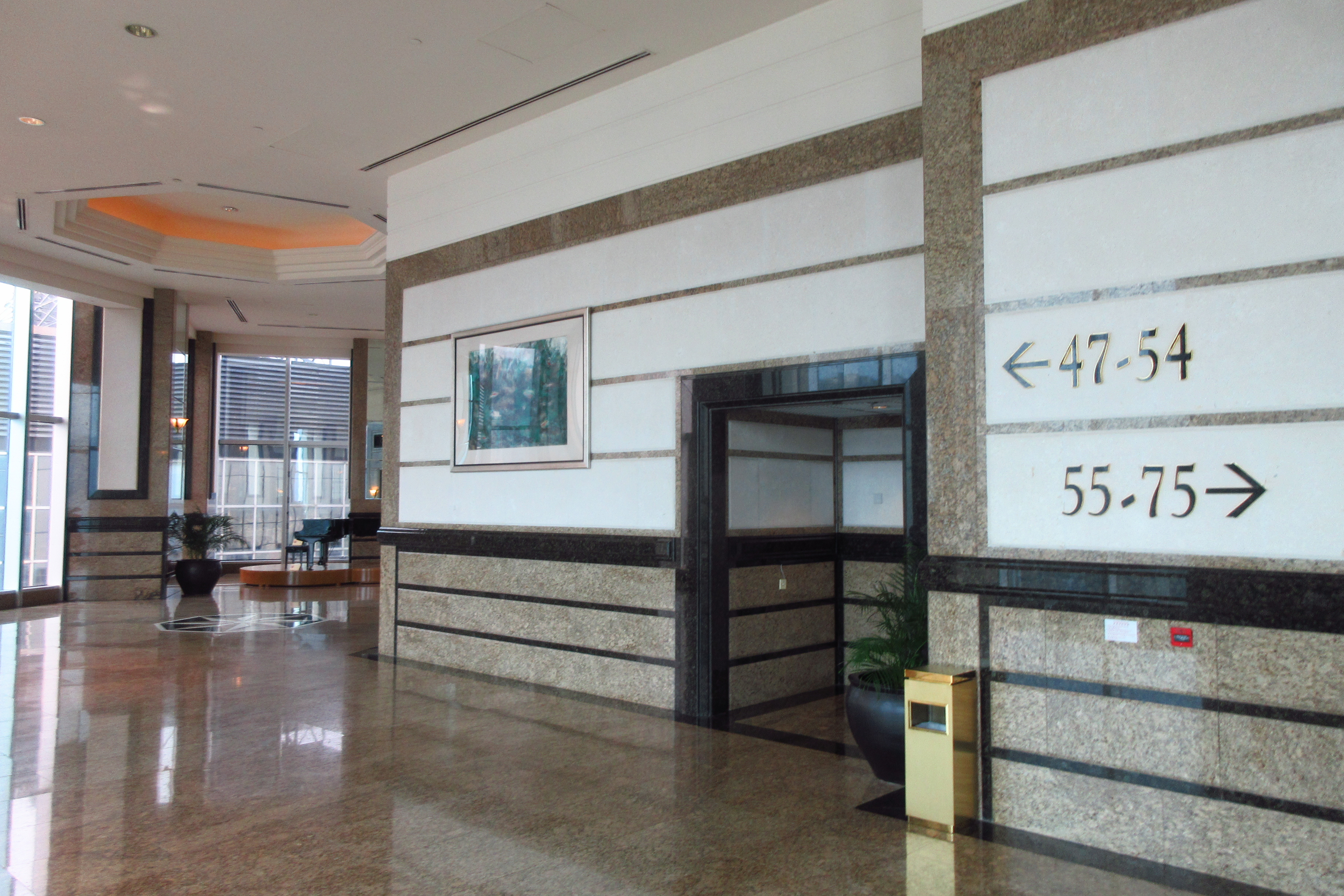
Sky lobby at Central Plaza in Hong Kong which has clear signage of the floors served by the different elevators.

Many tall buildings use elevators in a non-standard configuration to reduce their footprint. Buildings such as the former World Trade Center Towers and Chicago's John Hancock Center use sky lobbies, where express elevators take passengers to upper floors which serve as the base for local elevators. This allows architects and engineers to place elevator shafts on top of each other, saving space. Sky lobbies and express elevators take up a significant amount of space, however, and add to the amount of time spent commuting between floors.

Other buildings, such as the Petronas Towers, use double-deck elevators, allowing more people to fit in a single elevator, and reaching two floors at every stop. It is possible to use even more than two levels on an elevator, although this has never been done. The main problem with double-deck elevators is that they cause everyone in the elevator to stop when only person on one level needs to get off at a given floor.

Buildings with sky lobbies include the World Trade Center, Petronas Twin Towers, Willis Tower and Taipei 101. The 44th-floor sky lobby of the John Hancock Center also featured the first high-rise indoor swimming pool, which remains the highest in the United States.

== Economic rationale ==
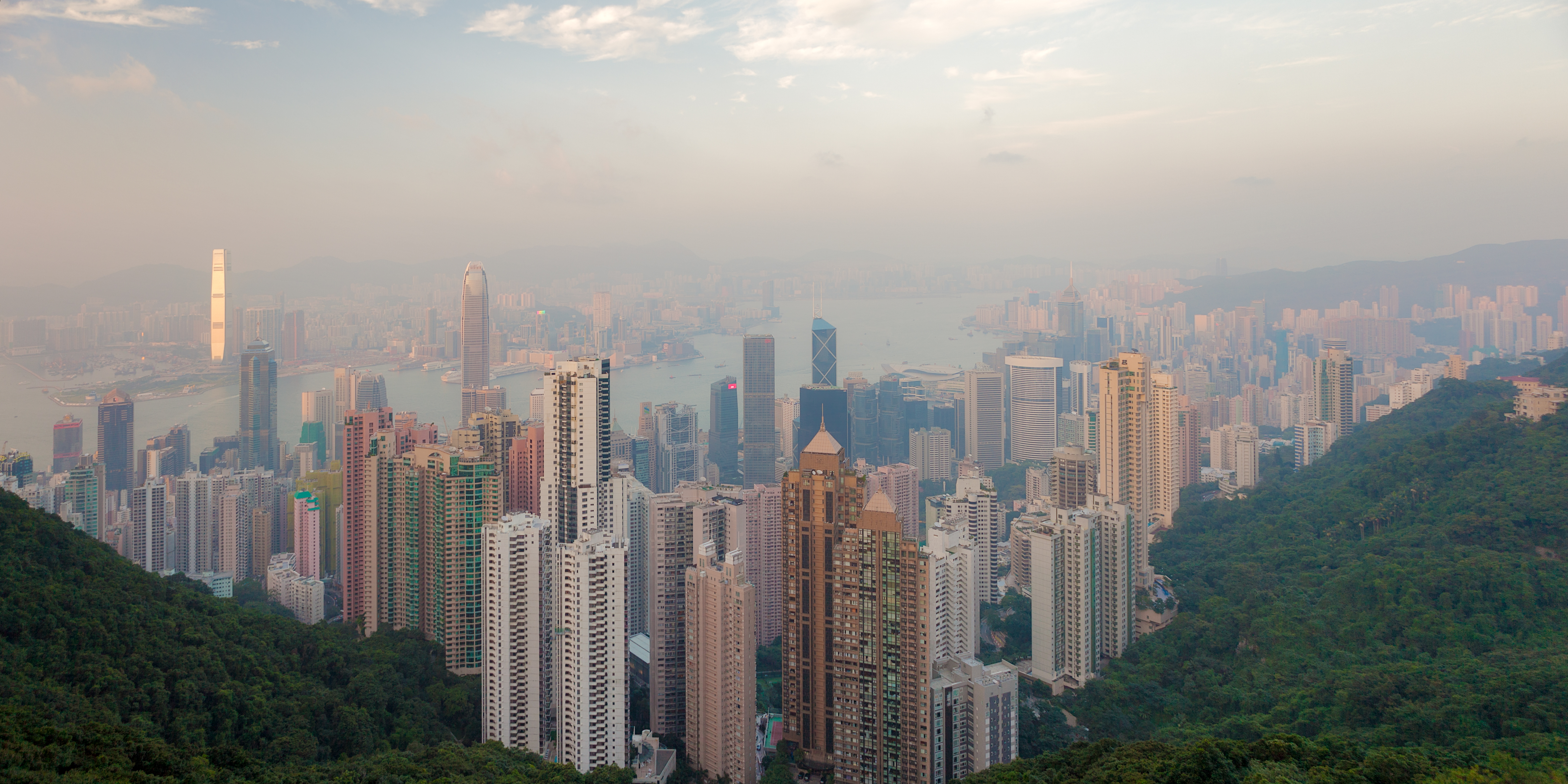
Hong Kong's high land prices and geographic limitations justify the construction of skyscrapers

Skyscrapers are usually situated in city centres where the price of land is high. Constructing a skyscraper becomes justified if the price of land is so high that it makes economic sense to build upward as to minimize the cost of the land per the total floor area of a building. Thus the construction of skyscrapers is dictated by economics and results in skyscrapers in a certain part of a large city unless a building code restricts the height of buildings.

Skyscrapers are rarely seen in small cities and they are characteristic of large cities, because of the critical importance of high land prices for the construction of skyscrapers. Usually only office, commercial and hotel users can afford the rents in the city center and thus most tenants of skyscrapers are of these classes.

Today, skyscrapers are an increasingly common sight where land is expensive, as in the centres of big cities, because they provide such a high ratio of rentable floor space per unit area of land.

Another disadvantage of very high skyscrapers is the loss of usable floorspace, as many elevator shafts are needed to enable performant vertical travelling. This led to the introduction of express lifts and sky lobbies where transfer to slower distribution lifts can be done.

== Environmental impact ==
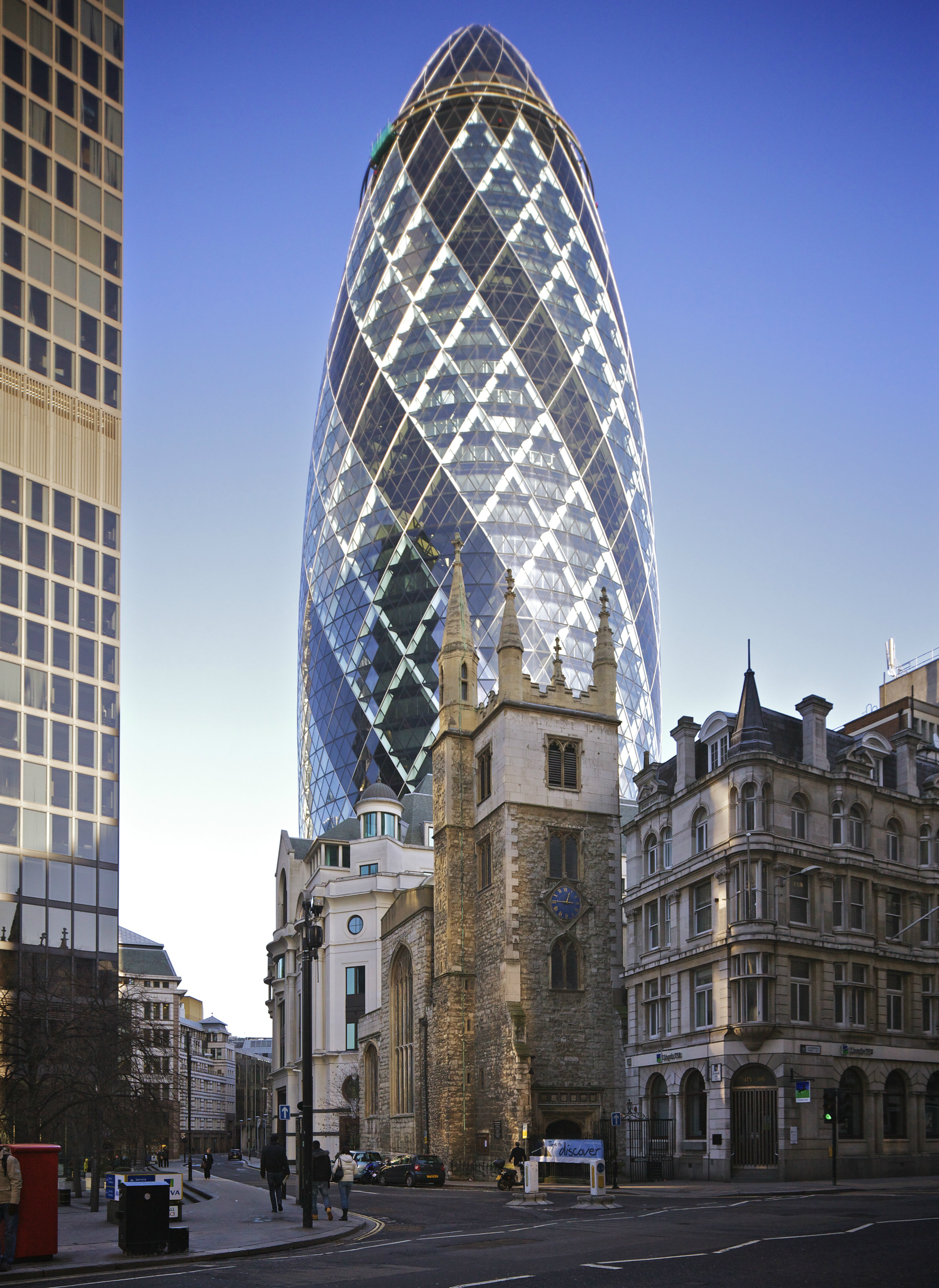
The Gherkin in London is an example of a modern environmentally friendly skyscraper.

Constructing a single skyscraper requires large quantities of materials like steel, concrete, and glass, and these materials represent significant embodied energy. Skyscrapers are thus material and energy intensive buildings.

Skyscrapers have considerable mass, requiring a stronger foundation than a shorter, lighter building. In construction, building materials must be lifted to the top of a skyscraper during construction, requiring more energy than would be necessary at lower heights. Furthermore, a skyscraper consumes much electricity because potable and non-potable water have to be pumped to the highest occupied floors, skyscrapers are usually designed to be mechanically ventilated, elevators are generally used instead of stairs, and electric lights are needed in rooms far from the windows and windowless spaces such as elevators, bathrooms and stairwells.

Skyscrapers can be artificially lit and the energy requirements can be covered by renewable energy or other electricity generation with low greenhouse gas emissions. Heating and cooling of skyscrapers can be efficient, because of centralized HVAC systems, heat radiation blocking windows and small surface area of the building. There is Leadership in Energy and Environmental Design (LEED) certification for skyscrapers. For example, the Empire State Building received a gold Leadership in Energy and Environmental Design rating in September 2011 and the Empire State Building is the tallest LEED certified building in the United States, proving that skyscrapers can be environmentally friendly. The Gherkin in London, the United Kingdom is another example of an environmentally friendly skyscraper.

In the lower levels of a skyscraper a larger percentage of the building floor area must be devoted to the building structure and services than is required for lower buildings:

- More structure – because it must be stronger to support more floors above
- The elevator conundrum creates the need for more lift shafts—everyone comes in at the bottom and they all have to pass through the lower part of the building to get to the upper levels.
- Building services – power and water enter the building from below and have to pass through the lower levels to get to the upper levels.

In low-rise structures, the support rooms (chillers, transformers, boilers, pumps and air handling units) can be put in basements or roof space—areas which have low rental value. There is, however, a limit to how far this plant can be located from the area it serves. The farther away it is the larger the risers for ducts and pipes from this plant to the floors they serve and the more floor area these risers take. In practice this means that in highrise buildings this plant is located on 'plant levels' at intervals up the building.

=== Operational energy ===
The building sector accounts for approximately 50% of greenhouse gas emissions, with operational energy accounting for 80-90% of building related energy use. Operational energy use is affected by the magnitude of conduction between the interior and exterior, convection from infiltrating air, and radiation through glazing. The extent to which these factors affect the operational energy vary depending on the microclimate of the skyscraper, with increased wind speeds as the height of the skyscraper increases, and a decrease in the dry bulb temperature as the altitude increases. For example, when moving from 1.5 meters to 284 meters, the dry bulb temperature decreased by 1.85 °C while the wind speeds increased from 2.46 meters per seconds to 7.75 meters per second, which led to a 2.4% decrease in summer cooling in reference to the Freedom Tower in New York City. However, for the same building it was found that the annual energy use intensity was 9.26% higher because of the lack of shading at high altitudes which increased the cooling loads for the remainder of the year while a combination of temperature, wind, shading, and the effects of reflections led to a combined 13.13% increase in annual energy use intensity.

In a study performed by Leung and Ray in 2013, it was found that the average energy use intensity of a structure with between 0 and 9 floors was approximately 80 kBtu/ft/yr, while the energy use intensity of a structure with more than 50 floors was about 117 kBtu/ft/yr. The slight decrease in energy use intensity over 30-39 floors can be attributed to the fact that the increase in pressure within the heating, cooling, and water distribution systems levels out at a point between 40 and 49 floors and the energy savings due to the microclimate of higher floors are able to be seen. There is a gap in data in which another study looking at the same information but for taller buildings is needed.

==== Elevators ====
A portion of the operational energy increase in tall buildings is related to the usage of elevators because the distance traveled and the speed at which they travel increases as the height of the building increases. About 5% of the total energy consumed in a tall building is from the use of elevators.

=== Embodied energy ===
The embodied energy associated with the construction of skyscrapers varies based on the materials used. Embodied energy is quantified per unit of material. Skyscrapers inherently have higher embodied energy than low-rise buildings due to the increase in material used as more floors are built. For all floor types except for steel-concrete floors, it was found that after 60 stories, there was a decrease in unit embodied energy but when considering all floors, there was exponential growth due to a double dependence on height. The first of which is the relationship between an increase in height leading to an increase in the quantity of materials used, and the second being the increase in height leading to an increase in size of elements to increase the structural capacity of the building. A careful choice in building materials can likely reduce the embodied energy without reducing the number of floors constructed within the bounds presented.

=== Embodied carbon ===
Similar to embodied energy, the embodied carbon of a building is dependent on the materials chosen for its construction. Both methods of measuring the embodied carbon show that there is a point where the embodied carbon is lowest before increasing again as the height increases. For the total embodied carbon it is dependent on the structure type, but is either around 40 stories, or approximately 60 stories. For the square meter of gross floor area, the lowest embodied carbon was found at either 40 stories, or approximately 70 stories.

=== Air pollution ===
In urban areas, the configuration of buildings can lead to exacerbated wind patterns and an uneven dispersion of pollutants. When the height of buildings surrounding a source of air pollution is increased, the size and occurrence of both "dead-zones" and "hotspots" were increased in areas where there were almost no pollutants and high concentrations of pollutants, respectively. This progression shows how as the height of Building F increases, the dispersion of pollutants decreases, but the concentration within the building cluster increases. The variation of velocity fields can be affected by the construction of new buildings as well, rather than solely the increase in height.

As urban centers continue to expand upward and outward, the present velocity fields will continue to trap polluted air close to the tall buildings within the city. Specifically within major cities, a majority of air pollution is derived from transportation, whether it be cars, trains, planes, or boats. As urban sprawl continues and pollutants continue to be emitted, the air pollutants will continue to be trapped within these urban centers. Different pollutants can be detrimental to human health in different ways. For example, particulate matter from vehicular exhaust and power generation can cause asthma, bronchitis, and cancer, while nitrogen dioxide from motor engine combustion processes can cause neurological disfunction and asphyxiation.

=== LEED/green building rating ===
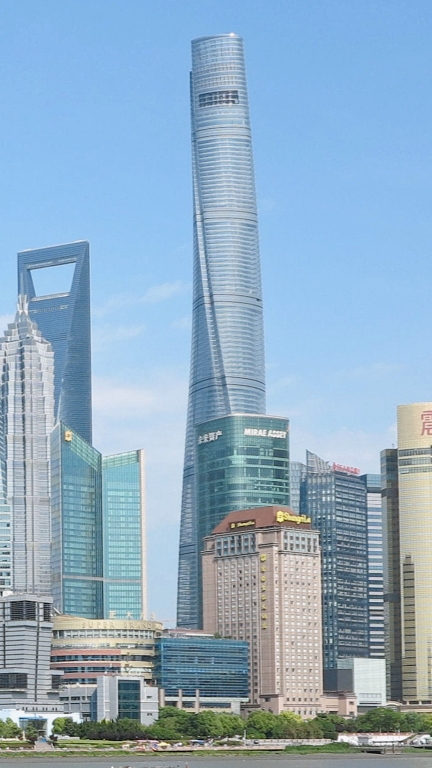
Shanghai Tower, the tallest and largest LEED Platinum certified building in the world since 2015

Like with all other buildings, if special measures are taken to incorporate sustainable design methods early on in the design process, it is possible to obtain a green building rating, such as a Leadership in Energy and Environmental Design (LEED) certification. An integrated design approach is crucial in making sure that design decisions that positively impact the whole building are made at the beginning of the process. Because of the massive scale of skyscrapers, the decisions made by the design team must take all factors into account, including the buildings impact on the surrounding community, the effect of the building on the direction in which air and water move, and the impact of the construction process, must be taken into account. There are several design methods that could be employed in the construction of a skyscraper that would take advantage of the height of the building.

The microclimates that exist as the height of the building increases can be taken advantage of to increase the natural ventilation, decrease the cooling load, and increase daylighting. Natural ventilation can be increased by utilizing the stack effect, in which warm air moves upward and increases the movement of the air within the building. If utilizing the stack effect, buildings must take extra care to design for fire separation techniques, as the stack effect can also exacerbate the severity of a fire. Skyscrapers are considered to be internally dominated buildings because of their size as well as the fact that a majority are used as some sort of office building with high cooling loads. Due to the microclimate created at the upper floors with the increased wind speed and the decreased dry bulb temperatures, the cooling load will naturally be reduced because of infiltration through the thermal envelope. By taking advantage of the naturally cooler temperatures at higher altitudes, skyscrapers can reduce their cooling loads passively. On the other side of this argument, is the lack of shading at higher altitudes by other buildings, so the solar heat gain will be larger for higher floors than for floors at the lower end of the building. Special measures should be taken to shade upper floors from sunlight during the overheated period to ensure thermal comfort without increasing the cooling load.

== History of the tallest skyscrapers ==
At the beginning of the 20th century, New York City was a center for the Beaux-Arts architectural movement, attracting the talents of such great architects as Stanford White and Carrere and Hastings. As better construction and engineering technology became available as the century progressed, New York City and Chicago became the focal point of the competition for the tallest building in the world. Each city's striking skyline has been composed of numerous and varied skyscrapers, many of which are icons of 20th-century architecture:

- The E. V. Haughwout Building in Manhattan was the first building to successfully install a passenger elevator, doing so on 23 March 1857.
- The Equitable Life Building in Manhattan was the first office building to feature passenger elevators.
- The Home Insurance Building by William Le Baron Jenney in Chicago, which was built in 1884, was the first tall building with a steel skeleton.
- The Singer Building, an expansion to an existing structure in Lower Manhattan was the world's tallest building when completed in 1908. Designed by Ernest Flagg, it was 612 feet (187 m) tall.
- The Metropolitan Life Insurance Company Tower, across Madison Square Park from the Flatiron Building, was the world's tallest building when completed in 1909. It was designed by the architectural firm of Napoleon LeBrun & Sons and stood 700 feet (210 m) tall.
- The Woolworth Building, a neo-Gothic "Cathedral of Commerce" overlooking New York City Hall, was designed by Cass Gilbert. At 792 feet (241 m), it became the world's tallest building upon its completion in 1913, an honor it retained until 1930.
- 40 Wall Street, a 71-story, 927-foot-tall (283 m) neo-Gothic tower designed by H. Craig Severance, was the world's tallest building for a month in May 1930.
- The Chrysler Building in New York City took the lead in late May 1930 as the tallest building in the world, reaching 1,046 feet (319 m). Designed by William Van Alen, an Art Deco style masterpiece with an exterior crafted of brick, the Chrysler Building continues to be a favorite of New Yorkers to this day.
- The Empire State Building, nine streets south of the Chrysler in Manhattan, topped out at 1,250 feet (381 m) and 102 stories in 1931. The first building to have more than 100 floors, it was designed by Shreve, Lamb and Harmon in the contemporary Art Deco style and takes its name from the nickname of New York State. The antenna mast added in 1951 brought pinnacle height to 1,472 feet (449 m), lowered in 1984 to 1,454 feet (443 m).
- The World Trade Center by Minoru Yamasaki officially surpassed the Empire State Building in 1971, was completed in 1973, and consisted of two tall towers and several smaller buildings. For a short time the World Trade Center's North Tower―completed in 1972―was the world's tallest building, until surpassed by the Sears Tower in 1973. Upon completion, the towers stood for 28 years, until the September 11 attacks destroyed the buildings in 2001.
- The Sears Tower (now known as Willis Tower) was completed in 1974. It was the first building to employ the "bundled tube" structural system, designed by Fazlur Khan. It was surpassed in height by the Petronas Towers in 1998, but remained the tallest in some categories until Burj Khalifa surpassed it in all categories in 2009. It is currently the third tallest building in the United States, after One World Trade Center (which was built following 9/11), and Central Park Tower in New York City.

Momentum in setting records passed from the United States to other nations with the opening of the Petronas Twin Towers in Kuala Lumpur, Malaysia, in 1998. The record for the world's tallest building has remained in Asia since the opening of Taipei 101 in Taipei, Taiwan, in 2004. A number of architectural records, including those of the world's tallest building and tallest free-standing structure, moved to the Middle East with the opening of the Burj Khalifa in Dubai, United Arab Emirates.

This geographical transition is accompanied by a change in approach to skyscraper design. For much of the 20th century large buildings took the form of simple geometrical shapes. This reflected the "international style" or modernist philosophy shaped by Bauhaus architects early in the century. The last of these, the Willis Tower and World Trade Center towers in New York, erected in the 1970s, reflect the philosophy. Tastes shifted in the decade which followed, and new skyscrapers began to exhibit postmodernist influences. This approach to design avails itself of historical elements, often adapted and re-interpreted, in creating technologically modern structures. The Petronas Twin Towers recall Asian pagoda architecture and Islamic geometric principles. Taipei 101 likewise reflects the pagoda tradition as it incorporates ancient motifs such as the ruyi symbol. The Burj Khalifa draws inspiration from traditional Islamic art. Architects in recent years have sought to create structures that would not appear equally at home if set in any part of the world, but that reflect the culture thriving in the spot where they stand.

The following list measures height of the roof, not the pinnacle. The more common gauge is the "highest architectural detail"; such ranking would have included Petronas Towers, built in 1998.

Built	Building	City	Country	Official Height		Floors	Pinnacle		Current status
1870	Equitable Life Building	New York	United States	43 m	142 ft	8			Destroyed by fire in 1912
1889	Auditorium Building	Chicago	United States	82 m	270 ft	17			Standing
1890	New York World Building	New York	United States	94 m	309 ft	20	106 m	349 ft	Demolished in 1955
1894	Philadelphia City Hall	Philadelphia	United States	155.8 m	511 ft	9	167 m	548 ft	Standing
1908	Singer Building	New York	United States	187 m	612 ft	47			Demolished in 1968
1909	Met Life Tower	New York	United States	213 m	700 ft	50			Standing
1913	Woolworth Building	New York	United States	241 m	792 ft	57			Standing
1930	40 Wall Street	New York	United States	282 m	925 ft	70	283 m	927 ft	Standing
1930	Chrysler Building	New York	United States	319 m	1046 ft	77	319 m	1,046 ft	Standing
1931	Empire State Building	New York	United States	381 m	1,250 ft	102	443 m	1,454 ft	Standing
1972	World Trade Center (North Tower)	New York	United States	417 m	1,368 ft	110	526.8 m	1,728 ft	Destroyed in 2001 in the September 11 attacks
1974	Willis Tower (formerly Sears Tower)	Chicago	United States	442 m	1,450 ft	110	527.3 m	1,729 ft	Standing
1998	Petronas Towers	Kuala Lumpur	Malaysia	451.9 m	1,483 ft	88	451.9 m	1,483 ft	Standing
2004	Taipei 101	Taipei	Taiwan	508.3 m	1,667 ft	101	509.2 m	1,668 ft	Standing
2010	Burj Khalifa	Dubai	United Arab Emirates	828 m	2,717 ft	163	829.8 m	2,722 ft	Standing

=== Gallery ===
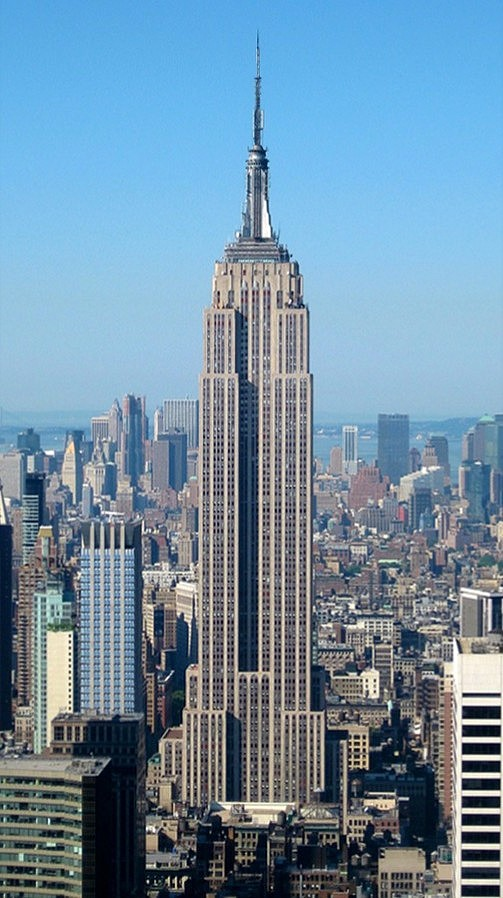
The Empire State Building was the tallest from 1931 to 1971. It was the first skyscraper to have over 100 floors.

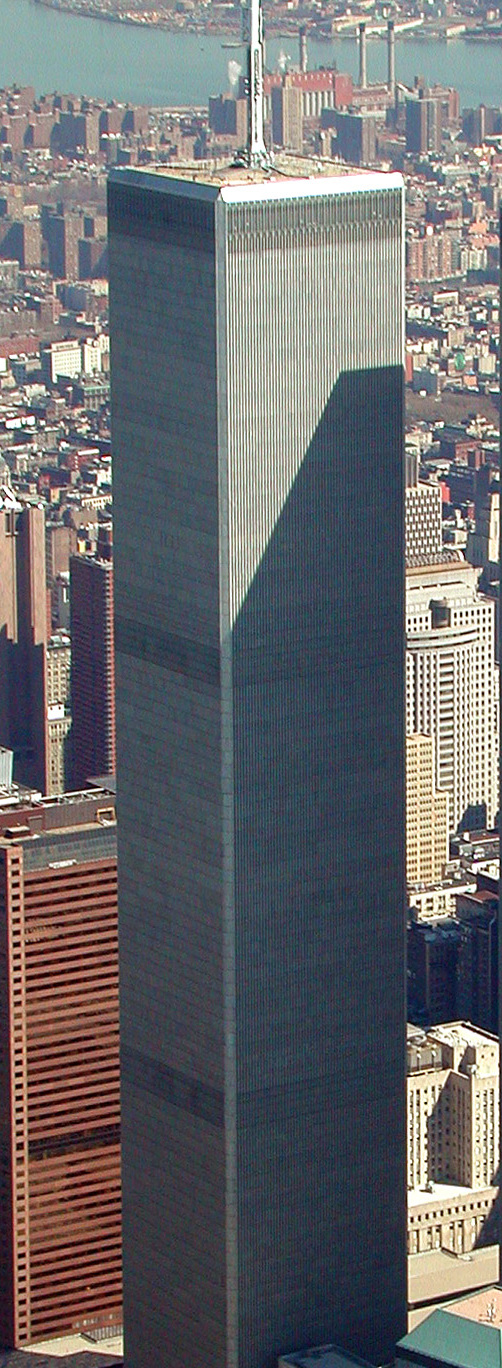
The original 1 World Trade Center (North Tower) was the tallest in the world from 1971 to 1973.

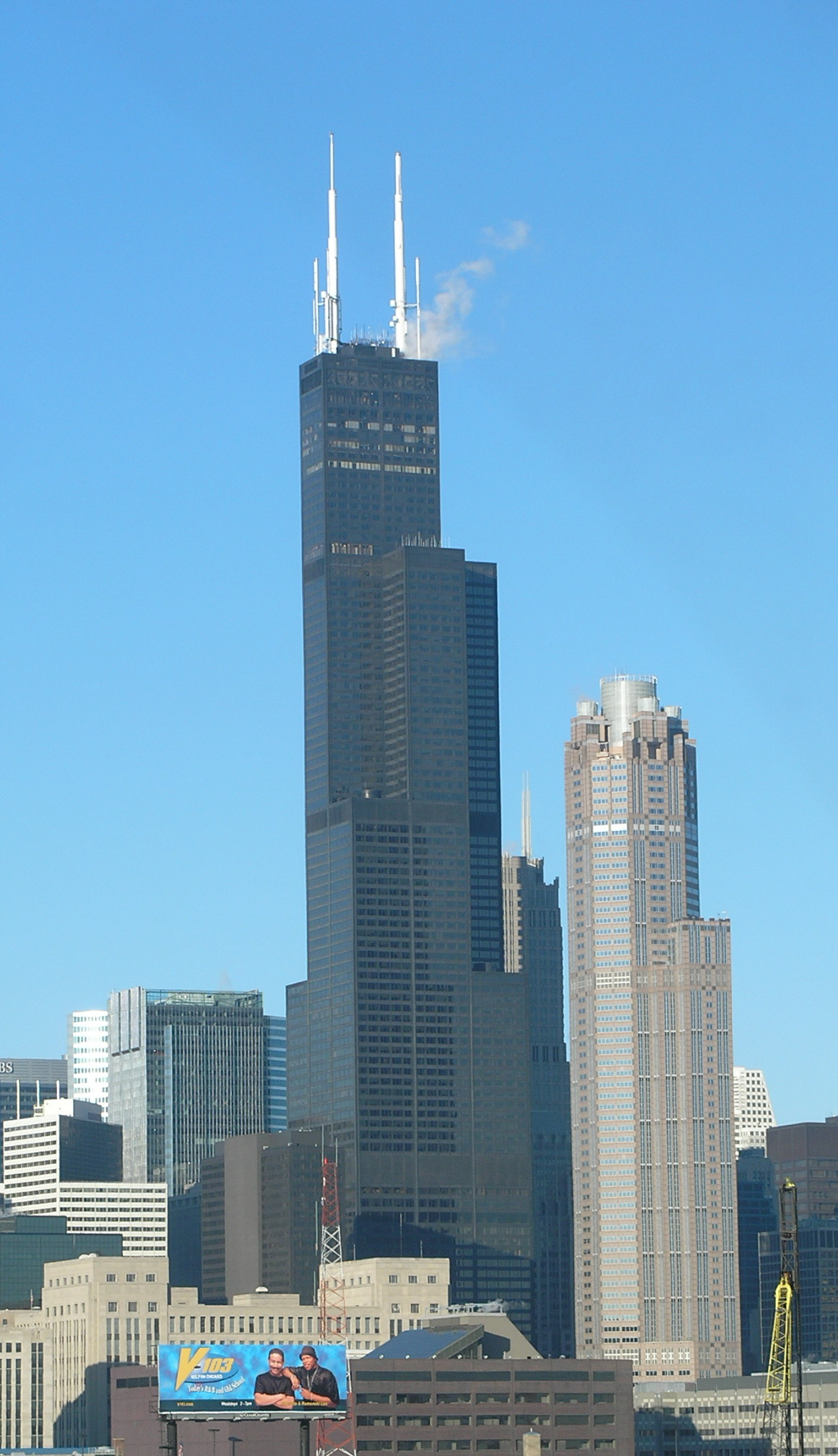
The Willis Tower in Chicago, formerly the Sears Tower, was the world's tallest building from 1973 to 1998.

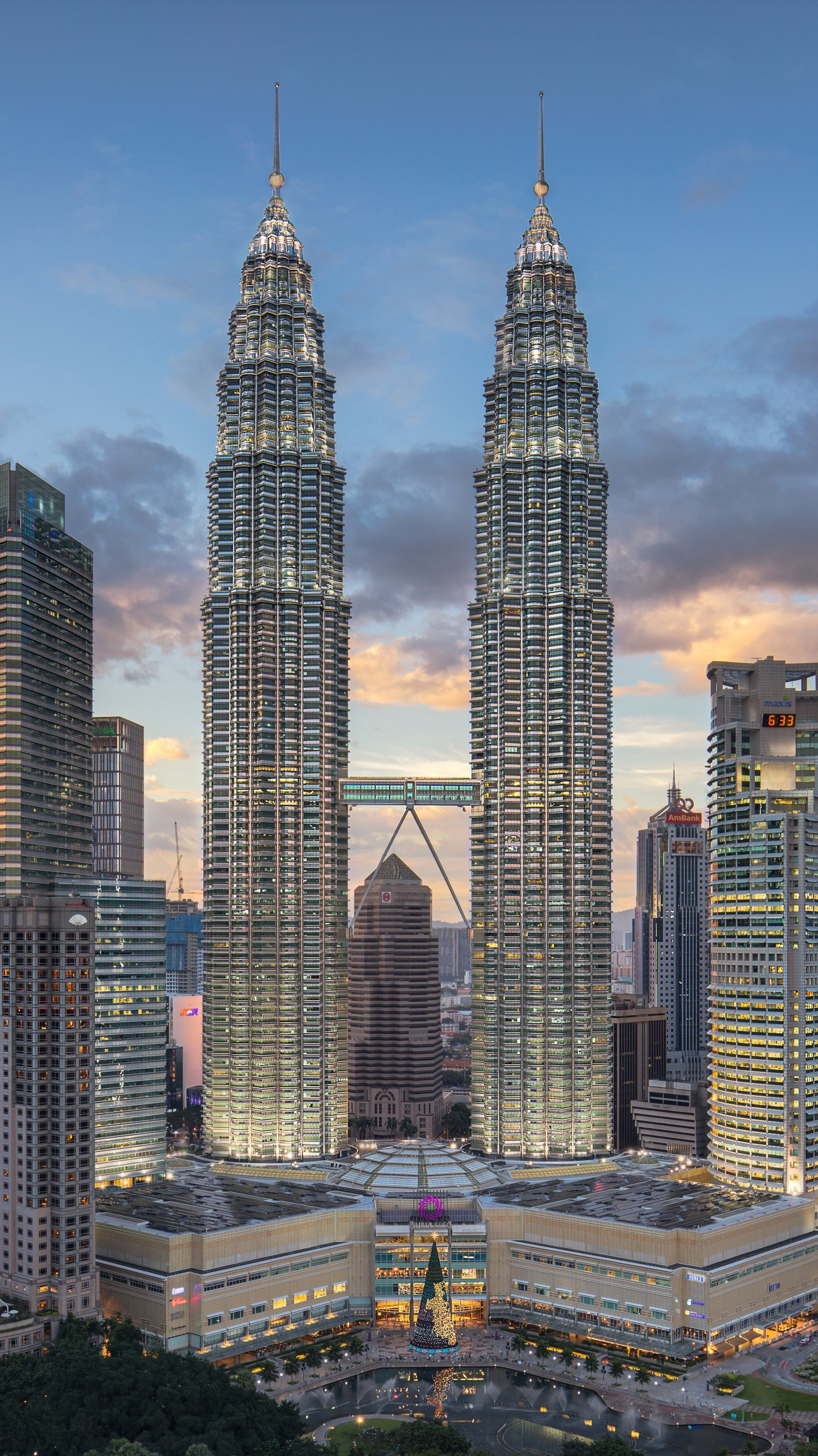
The Petronas Towers in Kuala Lumpur were the tallest from 1998 to 2003.

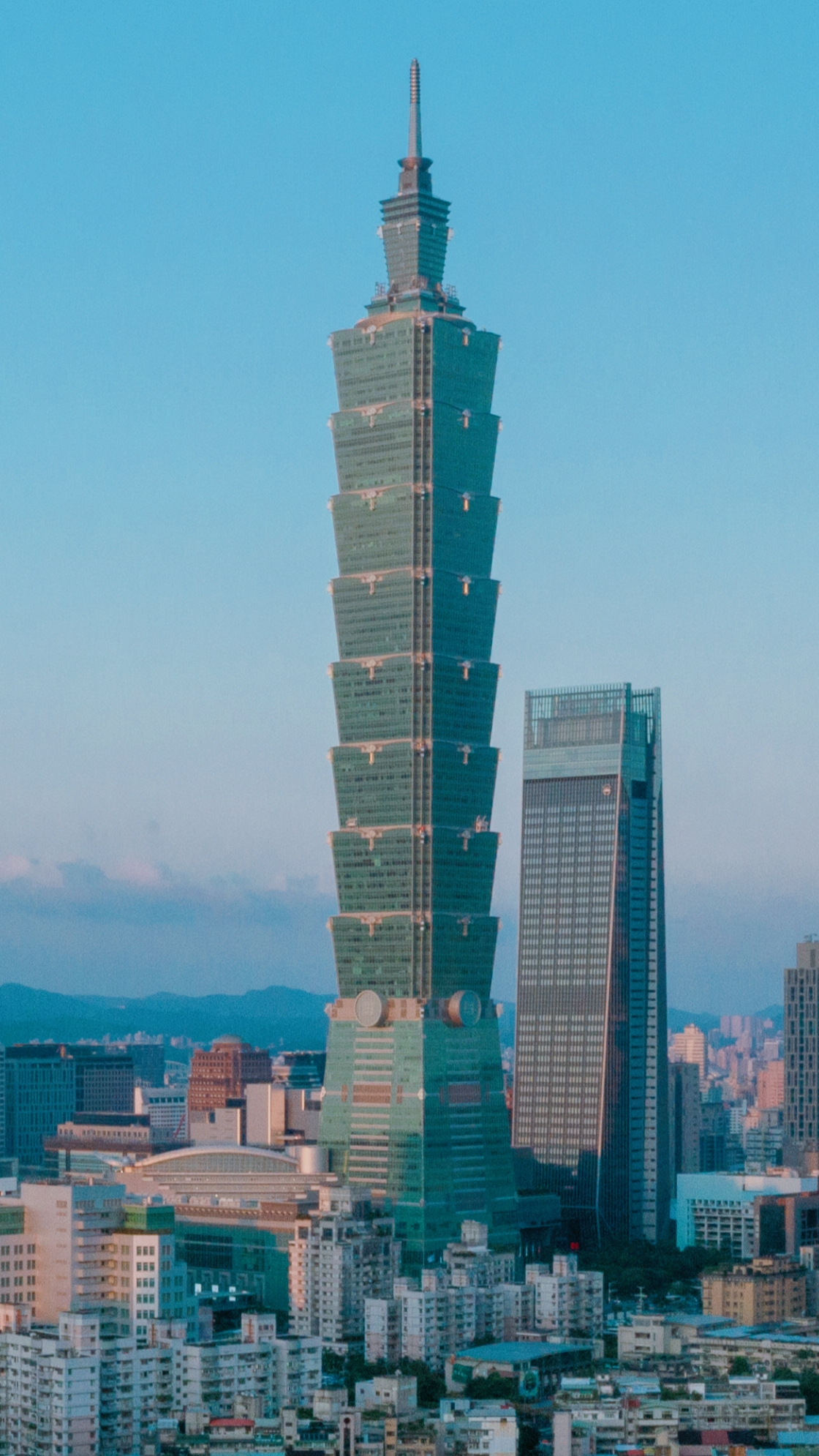
Taipei 101 in Taipei, the world's tallest skyscraper from 2003 to 2009, was the first to exceed the 500 m (1,600 ft) mark.

The Burj Khalifa is the current tallest building in the world. The setbacks at various heights are a typical skyscraper feature.

== Future developments ==
Proposals for such structures have been put forward, including the Burj Mubarak Al Kabir in Kuwait and Azerbaijan Tower in Baku. Kilometer-plus structures present architectural challenges that may eventually place them in a new architectural category. The first building under construction and planned to be over one kilometre tall is the Jeddah Tower.

=== Wooden skyscrapers ===
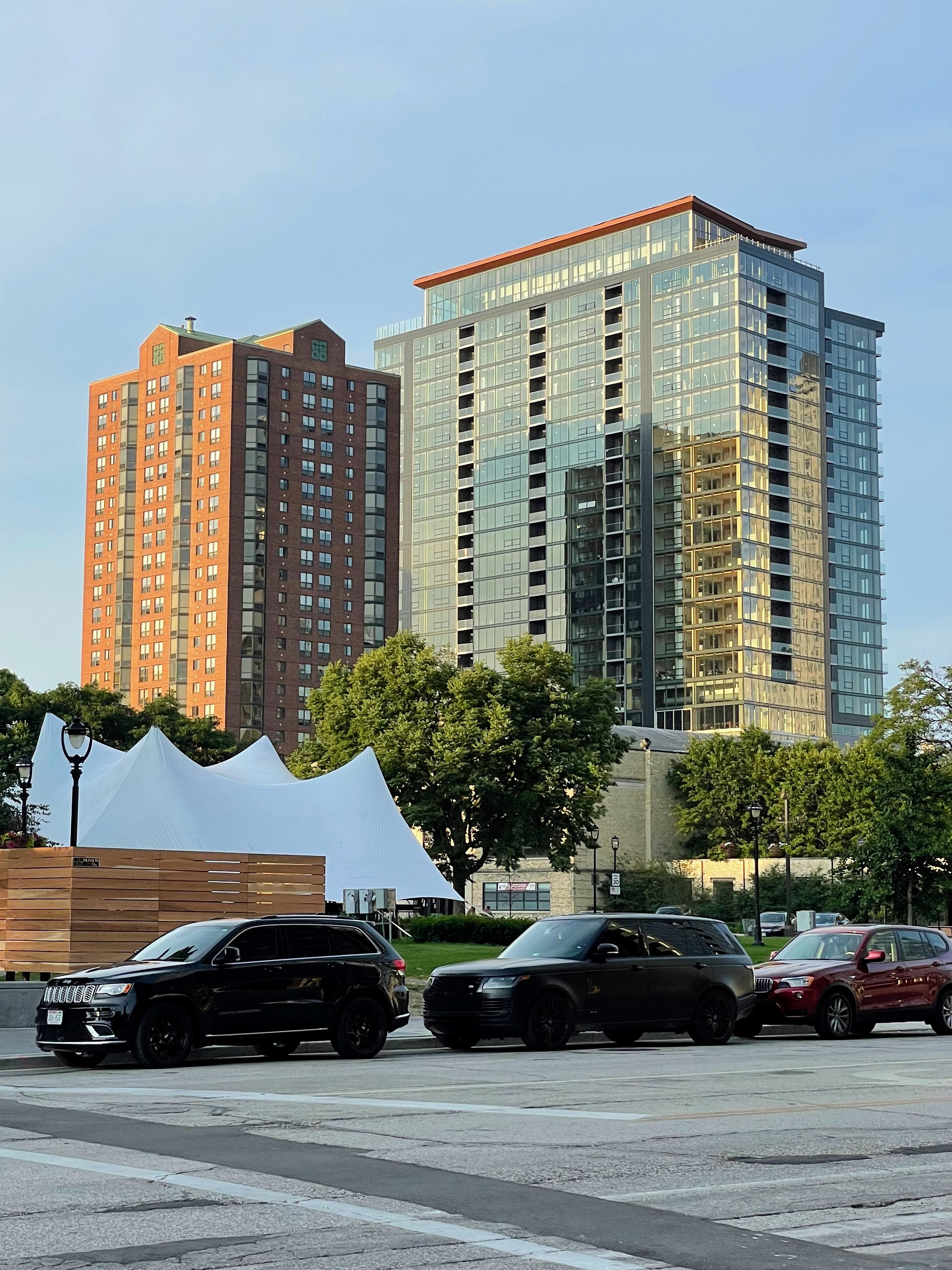
The 25-story Ascent MKE is the world highest mass timber structure.

Several wooden skyscraper designs have been designed and built. A 14-story housing project in Bergen, Norway known as 'Treet' or 'The Tree' became the world's tallest wooden apartment block when it was completed in late 2015. The Tree's record was eclipsed by Brock Commons, an 18-story, 53 m wooden dormitory at the University of British Columbia in Canada, when it was completed in September 2016. Mjostirnet in Brumunddal, Norway, finished in 2019, rises 85.4 m, and the 2022 construction of the 25 storey Ascent MKE Building in Milwaukee, made it (in 2026) the tallest habitable structural timber building (or 'plyscraper') at 86.56 m.

A 40-story residential building 'Trätoppen' has been proposed by architect Anders Berensson to be built in Stockholm, Sweden. Trätoppen would be the tallest building in Stockholm, though there are no immediate plans to begin construction. The tallest currently-planned wooden skyscraper is the 70-story W350 Project in Tokyo, to be built by the Japanese wood products company Sumitomo Forestry Co. to celebrate its 350th anniversary in 2041. An 80-story wooden skyscraper, the River Beech Tower, has been proposed by a team including architects Perkins + Will and the University of Cambridge. The River Beech Tower, on the banks of the Chicago River in Chicago, Illinois, would be 348 feet shorter than the W350 Project despite having 10 more stories.

Wooden skyscrapers are estimated to be around a quarter of the weight of an equivalent reinforced-concrete structure as well as reducing the building carbon footprint by 60–75%. Buildings have been designed using cross-laminated timber (CLT) which gives a higher rigidity and strength to wooden structures. CLT panels are prefabricated and can therefore save on building time.

== See also ==
- CTBUH Skyscraper Award
- Earthscraper
- Emporis Skyscraper Award
- Groundscraper
- List of cities with the most skyscrapers
- List of tallest buildings
- List of tallest structures
- Pencil tower
- Plyscraper
- Seascraper
- Skyscraper design and construction
- Skyscraper Index
- Skyscraper Museum in NYC
- Skyline
- Vertical farming, "farmscrapers"
- World's littlest skyscraper
- Drag-coefficient
- Material-fatigue
- Down-force
- Steel frame
