= List of Bangladeshi inventions and discoveries =

The following is a list of Bangladeshi inventions and discoveries which lists inventions and discoveries made by Bangladeshis both within Bangladesh and outside the region, which owe their existence either partially or entirely to a person born in Bangladesh.

== Inventions and improvements ==
The following is a list of inventions, innovations or discoveries known or generally recognized to be Bangladeshi.

Topic	Inventions and discoveries	Image	Reference
Science and medicine	Sono arsenic filter was invented by Abul Hussam in 2006		
	Focused Impedance Measurement by Khondkar Siddique-e-Rabbani		
	Fingerprint Identification by Qazi Azizul Haque		
	YouTube by Jawed Karim		
Manufacturing bags	Sonali Bag or Golden Bag by Mubarak Ahmad Khan in 2018	Sonali Bag	
	Khan Academy by Sal Khan		
	Tube (structure) by Fazlur Rahman Khan		
Textile	Muslin by weavers of Dhaka		
	Kantha Stich		
	Jamdani Motifs		
	Phall		
	Jalfrezi		
	Bakarkhani		
	Sunflower Jalebi of Chowk Bazar Iftar Market		
Agriculture	Sugar (Sugarcane) from Ancient Bengal british india		
Economics and Finance	Microcredit by Muhammad Yunus		
	Microfinance by Muhammad Yunus		

== See also ==
- Invention
- List of Indian inventions and discoveries
- List of Pakistani inventions and discoveries
- Patent
