= Tube system =

Tube system may refer to:

- Tube (structure), a building structural system
- Rapid transit, an underground tube system
- London Underground, also nicknamed the Tube, a rapid transit system in London, England
