= Nessco Building =

Skyscraper in Tripoli, Libya

General information
- Status: Completed
- Type: Commercial
- Location: Tripoli, Libya
- Opening: 2007

Height
- Roof: 394 ft (120 m)

Technical details
- Floor count: 26

Nessco Building is a skyscraper in Tripoli, Libya. The 26 story building was completed in 2007.

== See also ==
- Skyscraper design and construction
- List of tallest buildings in Africa
