= Dan M. Frangopol =

American civil engineer

Dan Mircea Frangopol
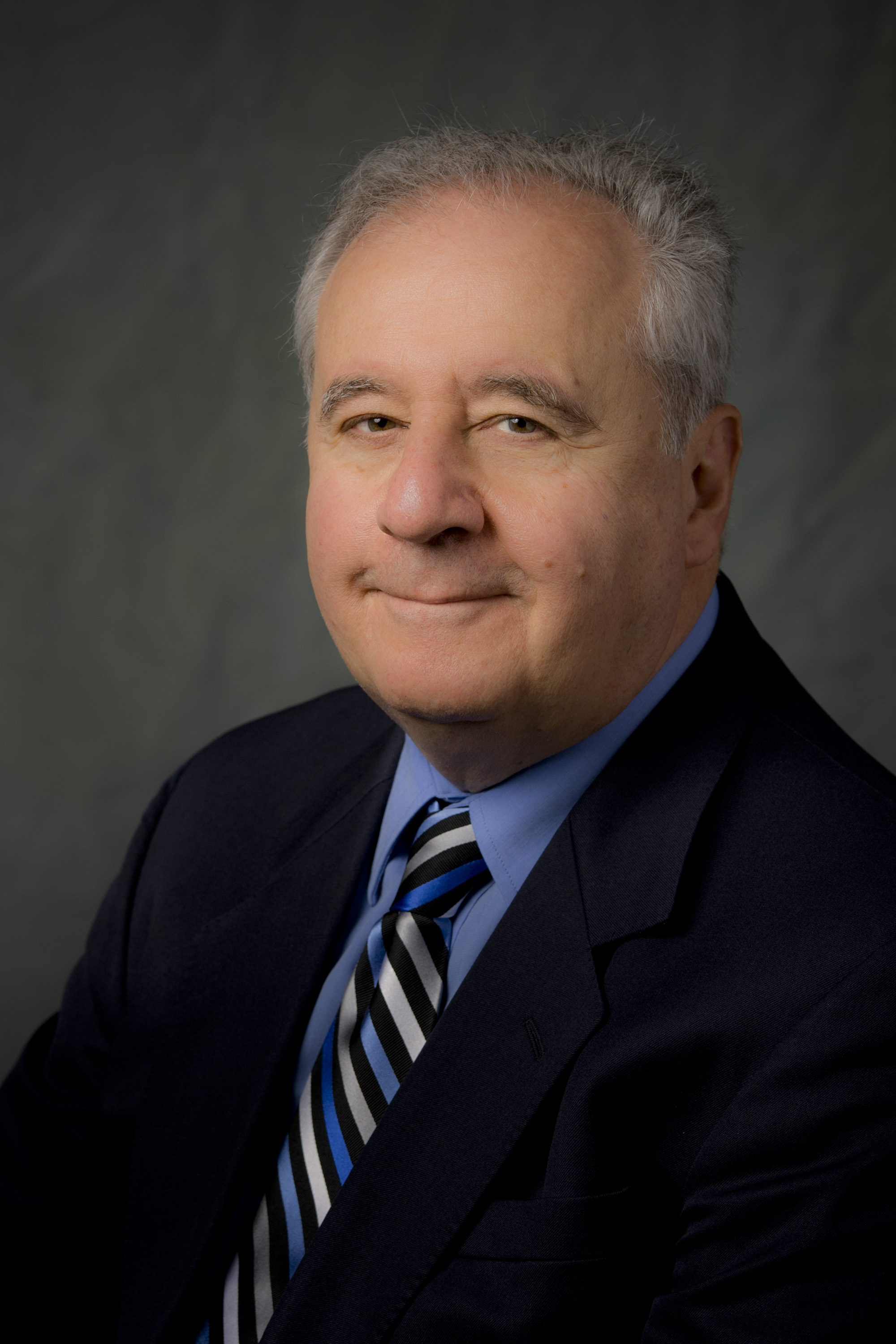
- Born: Romania
- Education: University of Liège, Belgium; Technical University of Civil Engineering of Bucharest, Romania
- Known for: Founding President of IABMAS and IALCCE; Founder and Editor-in-Chief of Structure and Infrastructure Engineering
- Scientific career
- Workplaces: Lehigh University, United States; University of Colorado Boulder, United States; University of Liège, Belgium; Technical University of Civil Engineering of Bucharest, Romania.
- Thesis: Probabilistic Study of Structural Safety (1976)
- Doctoral advisor: Charles E. Massonnet, J. Ferry-Borges
- Website: https://www.lehigh.edu/~dmf206/

Dan Mircea Frangopol is a Romanian-born American civil engineer and the inaugural holder of the Fazlur R. Khan Endowed Chair of Structural Engineering and Architecture at Lehigh University, Bethlehem, Pennsylvania.

He became a member of the National Academy of Engineering in 2025 for contributions to life-cycle civil engineering and leadership in its global development and adoption.

== Education, career, and academic positions ==
Frangopol received his civil engineering degree (Dipl.-Ing., equivalent to B.Sc.+M.Sc.) from the Institute of Civil Engineering, Bucharest, Romania in 1969 and his doctorate of Applied Sciences (Sc.D.) from the University of Liège, Belgium in 1976. His doctoral thesis, entitled Probabilistic Study of Structural Safety, was supervised by Charles E. Massonnet and J. Ferry-Borges.

After graduation in 1969, Frangopol held a position as assistant professor at the Institute of Civil Engineering in Bucharest until 1974 when he moved to Belgium to become a research structural engineer (structural reliability, analysis and design of inelastic structures, structural optimization) in the Department of Mechanics of Materials and Structural Engineering, University of Liège.

In 1977, Frangopol returned to Romania as an associate professor at the Institute of Civil Engineering in Bucharest and moved to Belgium in 1979, working as a structural design engineer at A. Lipski Consulting Engineers in Brussels. In March 1983, he joined the faculty of the University of Colorado at Boulder as an associate professor in the Department of Civil, Environmental and Architectural Engineering. He was promoted to full professor in 1988, and became an emeritus professor in 2006.

In 2006, he joined Lehigh University as Professor of Civil and Environmental Engineering and the inaugural holder of the Fazlur R. Khan Endowed Chair of Structural Engineering and Architecture, and became an emeritus professor in 2025.

Frangopol is an experienced researcher and consultant to industry and government agencies, both nationally and abroad. His work has been funded by NSF, FHWA, ONR, NASA, USACE, AFOSR, ARDEC, NCHRP, US DOT UTC, CDOT, FDOT, PennDOT, ASCE, NATO, and by numerous other agencies including Pennsylvania Infrastructure Technology Alliance, ArcelorMittal, Modjeski and Masters, Progeny Systems Corporation, Henry Luce Foundation, U.K. Highway Agency and the Dutch Ministry of Infrastructure and Environment.

He has authored or co-authored 5 books, 70 book chapters, over 530 articles in refereed journals (including 18 prize-winning papers from ASCE, IABSE, Elsevier, and EC^{3} (European Council on Computing in Construction), and over 130 articles in ASCE journals), and more than 700 papers in conference proceedings. As of July 26, 2026, his h-index = 112, i10-index = 555, and the total number of citations is over 48,000 (Google Scholar). Frangopol is the founder and editor-in-chief of the peer-reviewed journal Structure and Infrastructure Engineering and the founding editor of the book series Structures and Infrastructures.

He is a pioneer in the fields of life-cycle civil and marine engineering and life-cycle cost optimization, and has been recognized as a leading educator and creator in these fields. Frangopol ranked as the 10th most-cited civil engineering author in the August 2019 Stanford University worldwide citation survey published in PLOS, and ranked No.1 (Lehigh University), No.45 (United States), and No.95 (World) on April 6, 2022, by Research.com on the list of top scientists in Engineering and Technology.

In 2012, Frangopol was described by ASCE as "a preeminent authority in bridge safety and maintenance management, structural systems reliability, and life-cycle engineering. His contributions have defined much of the practice around design specifications, management methods, and optimization approaches. From the maintenance of deteriorated structures and the development of system redundancy factors to assessing the performance of long-span structures, Dr. Frangopol's research has not only saved time and money, but very likely also saved lives." and in 2020, "Frangopol's groundbreaking research into infrastructure from a holistic perspective has earned him a reputation in the civil engineering community" as the "Father of Life-Cycle Analysis."

In 2023, ASCE established the "Dan M. Frangopol Medal for Life-Cycle Engineering of Civil Structures."

In 2025, the peer-reviewed journal Structure and Infrastructure Engineering published a double special issue in his honor.

== Honors and awards ==
Frangopol's membership in Academies include:

- National Academy of Engineering (NAE), Member, 2025
- Academy of Engineering of Mexico (AEM), Corresponding Member, 2023
- Canadian Academy of Engineering (CAE), International Fellow, 2022
- Engineering Academy of Japan (EAJ), Foreign Associate, 2020
- National Academy of Construction of the United States (NAC), Member, 2020
- Romanian Academy (AR), Honorary Member, 2017
- Royal Academy of Belgium for Science and the Arts (KVAB), Foreign Member, 2016
- Academia Europaea (Academy of Europe, London), Foreign Member, 2015
- Romanian Academy of Technical Sciences (ASTR), Honorary Member, 2000

Frangopol's national and international awards include:

- Arthur M. Wellington Prize, ASCE, 2026
- State-of-the-Art of Civil Engineering Award, ASCE, 2026
- Raymond C. Reese Research Prize, ASCE, 2026
- Inaugural Distinguished Service Award, IASSAR, 2025
- Alfred Noble Prize, ASCE, AIME, ASME, IEEE and WSE, 2024
- Opera Omnia Award, AICPS (Romanian Association of Structural Design Engineers), 2024
- International Award of Merit, EUROSTRUCT (European Association on Quality Control of Bridges and Structures), 2023
- Arthur M. Wellington Prize, ASCE, 2022
- Moisseiff Award, ASCE, 2022
- Thorpe Medal, EC^{3} (European Council on Computing in Construction), 2022
- Aftab Mufti Medal for Lifetime Achievement in Civil Structural Health Monitoring, ISHMII, 2021
- Alfred M. Freudenthal Medal, ASCE, 2020
- Raymond C. Reese Research Prize, ASCE, 2020
- George W. Housner Structural Control and Monitoring Medal, ASCE, 2019
- State-of-the-Art of Civil Engineering Award, ASCE, 2019
- Alfredo Ang Award (inaugural winner), ASCE, 2016
- Civil Engineer of the Year Award, ASCE LV Section, 2016
- OPAL Lifetime Achievement Award in Education, ASCE, 2016
- Alfred Noble Prize, ASCE, AIME, ASME, IEEE and WSE, 2015
- J. James R. Croes Medal, ASCE, 2014
- Arthur M. Wellington Prize, ASCE, 2012
- Fazlur R. Khan Life-Cycle Civil Engineering Medal (inaugural winner), IALCCE, 2012
- Distinguished Member (the highest honor ASCE can bestow), ASCE, 2010
- Ernest E. Howard Award, ASCE, 2007
- OPA (Outstanding Paper Award), IABSE, 2007
- Munro Prize, Elsevier, 2006
- T.Y. Lin Medal (inaugural winner IABMAS & T.Y. Lin International), 2006
- Nathan M. Newmark Medal, ASCE, 2005
- State-of-the-Art of Civil Engineering Award, ASCE, 2004
- Moisseiff Award, ASCE, 2003
- J. James R. Croes Medal, ASCE, 2001
- Senior Research Prize, IASSAR, 2001
- State-of-the-Art of Civil Engineering Award, ASCE, 1998
- Distinguished Probabilistic Methods Educator Award (inaugural winner), Society of Automotive Engineers (SAE) International, 1996

ASCE established the "Dan M. Frangopol Medal for Life-Cycle Engineering of Civil Structures." This award was officially instituted by action of the Board of Direction on October 18, 2023.

He is the Founding President of the International Association for Bridge Maintenance and Safety (IABMAS) and of the International Association for Life-Cycle Civil Engineering (IALCCE) and has held the following honorary roles:

- Honorary President, International Association for Bridge Maintenance and Safety - Romania (2025), Sweden (2023), Canada (2022), USA (2020), Sri Lanka (2019), Korea (2018), Turkey (2018), Chile (2017), Italy (2013), and Brazil (2013).
- Honorary Member, International Association for Bridge Maintenance and Safety - Denmark (2023), Spain (2021), Japan (2015), Australia (2014), China (2012) and Portugal (2006).
- Honorary President, International Association for Life-Cycle Civil Engineering - The Netherlands (2020)

Frangopol is the Founding Vice-President of the International Society for Structural Health Monitoring of Intelligent Infrastructure (ISHMII, renamed SCSHM) and the inaugural Fellow of SEI in 2012 and EMI in 2013. He is also a Fellow of ACI, IABSE, ISHMII and JSPS.

He is the Past Chair of the Technical Activities Division of the Structural Engineering Institute of ASCE, Past Vice-President of the International Association for Structural Safety and Reliability (IASSAR), Past Chair of the Executive Board of IASSAR, and Past Vice-President of the Engineering Mechanics Institute (EMI) of ASCE.

Frangopol has been made an honorary professor by the following universities:

- China University of Petroleum (East China), Qingdao, China, 2019
- Shenyang Jianzhu University, Shenyang, China, 2018
- Hunan University, Changsha, China, 2016
- Beijing Jiaotong University, Beijing, China, 2015
- Chongqing Jiaotong University, Chongqing, China, 2015
- Changsha University of Science and Technology, Changsha, China, 2015
- Royal Melbourne Institute of Technology (RMIT University), Melbourne, Australia, 2015
- Dalian University of Technology, Dalian, China, 2014
- Harbin Institute of Technology, Harbin, China, 2013
- The Hong Kong Polytechnic University, Hong Kong, China, 2012
- Chang'an University, Xi'an, Shaanxi, China, 2012
- Southeast University, Nanjing, China, 2011
- Tianjin University, Tianjin, China, 2011
- Tongji University, Shanghai, China, 2009

Frangopol has been awarded the degree of Doctor Honoris Causa (Honorary Doctorate) at the following universities:

- Luleå University of Technology, Luleå, Sweden, 2026
- Polytechnic University of Timişoara, Timişoara, Romania, 2024
- Polytechnic University of Milan (Politecnico di Milano), Milan, Italy, 2016 (Laurea ad Honorem)
- Gheorghe Asachi Technical University of Iasi, Iasi, Romania, 2014
- University of Liège, Liège, Belgium, 2008
- Technical University of Civil Engineering of Bucharest, Bucharest, Romania, 2001

His other honors include:

- Rostock University Medal issued at the 600th anniversary of the foundation of the university, 2025
- Lynn S. Beedle Distinguished Civil and Environmental Engineering Award, CEE Department, Lehigh University, 2024
- Honorary Member, Romanian Association of Structural Design Engineers, 2024
- Award in Recognition of 18 years of Service to the CEE Department, Lehigh University, 2024
- Ranked No. 1 (Lehigh University), No. 45 (United States), and No. 95 (World) on April 6, 2022, by Research.com on the list of top scientists in Engineering and Technology, 2022
- Excellence in Research, Scholarship and Leadership Award, P. C. Rossin College of Engineering and Applied Science, Lehigh University, 2020
- Hillman Faculty Award, Lehigh University, 2019
- Ranked as the 10th most-cited civil engineering author in the August 2019 Stanford University worldwide citation survey published in PLOS, 2019
- JSPS Fellowship Award for Research in Japan, Japan Society for the Promotion of Science, Waseda University, Tokyo, 2017
- Honorary Member, Romanian Association for Wind Engineering, 2017
- Hillmann Award for Excellence in Graduate Advising, Lehigh University, 2016
- Certificate of Appreciation in recognition of distinguished service to Engineering Mechanics Institute (EMI) as the Vice President (2014-2015) and Member of the Board of Governors (2013-2015), American Society of Civil Engineers, 2015
- Honorary Member, Foundation of the Polytechnic University of Timișoara, Romania, 2014
- Eleanor and Joseph F. Libsch Research Award, Lehigh University, 2013
- Senior Prize, International Association for Bridge Maintenance and Safety, 2012
- IALCCE Senior Award, International Association for Life-Cycle Civil Engineering, 2008
- RAE Distinguished Visiting Fellowship Award, The Royal Academy of Engineering, for Research at the University of Surrey, 2008
- Honorary Member, International Federation for Information Processing (IFIP)-TC7 (WG7.5), 2006
- IFIP Award, International Federation for Information Processing, Working Group on Reliability and Optimization of Structural Systems, 2006
- Kajima Research Award, Kajima Corporation, 2004
- Excellence in Research, Scholarly and Creative Work Award, Boulder Faculty Assembly, University of Colorado Boulder, 2004
- Clarence L. Eckel Faculty Prize for Excellence, CEAE Department, University of Colorado Boulder, 2003
- Honorary Technical Advisor for Korea Infrastructure Safety and Technology Corporation (KISTEC), Seoul, Korea, 2003
- JSPS Fellowship Award for Research in Japan, Japan Society for the Promotion of Science, Kyoto University, Kyoto, Japan, 2003
- Service Award, CEAE Department, University of Colorado Boulder, 2002
- Distinguished Service Appreciation as Chair of the Technical Division Executive Committee of the Structural Engineering Institute, American Society of Civil Engineers, 2001
- Distinguished Achievement Award, CEAE Department, University of Colorado Boulder, 2000
- Faculty Research Award, College of Engineering and Applied Science, University of Colorado Boulder, 1999
- Award of Appreciation, Federal Highway Administration, 1998
- Research Development Award, CEAE Department, University of Colorado Boulder, 1998
- Research Development Award, CEAE Department, University of Colorado Boulder, 1988
- Teaching Award, CEAE Department, University of Colorado Boulder, 1987

== Selected publications ==
- Frangopol, Dan M.; Lin, Kai-Yung; Estes, Allen C. (October 1997). "Life-Cycle Cost Design of Deteriorating Structures". Journal of Structural Engineering. 123 (10): 1390–1401. doi:10.1061/(ASCE)0733-9445(1997)123:10(1390). ISSN 0733-9445.
- Frangopol, Dan M.; Kong, Jung S.; Gharaibeh, Emhaidy S. (2001-01-01). "Reliability-Based Life-Cycle Management of Highway Bridges". Journal of Computing in Civil Engineering. 15 (1): 27–34. doi:10.1061/(ASCE)0887-3801(2001)15:1(27). ISSN 0887-3801.
- Frangopol, Dan M.; Liu, Min (2007-03-01). "Maintenance and management of civil infrastructure based on condition, safety, optimization, and life-cycle cost∗". Structure and Infrastructure Engineering. 3 (1): 29–41. Bibcode:2007SIEng...3...29F. doi:10.1080/15732470500253164. ISSN 1573-2479. S2CID 109948375.
- Frangopol, Dan M. (2011-06-01). "Life-cycle performance, management, and optimisation of structural systems under uncertainty: accomplishments and challenges". Structure and Infrastructure Engineering. 7 (6): 389–413. Bibcode:2011SIEng...7..389F. doi:10.1080/15732471003594427. ISSN 1573-2479. S2CID 111352366.
- Bocchini, Paolo; Frangopol, Dan M.; Ummenhofer, Thomas; Zinke, Tim (2014-06-01). "Resilience and Sustainability of Civil Infrastructure: Toward a Unified Approach". Journal of Infrastructure Systems. 20 (2): 04014004. doi:10.1061/(ASCE)IS.1943-555X.0000177. ISSN 1943-555X.
- Frangopol, Dan M; Curley, James P (1987). "Effects of damage and redundancy on structural reliability". Journal of Structural Engineering. 113 (7): 1533–1549. doi:10.1061/(ASCE)0733-9445(1987)113:7(1533). ISSN 1943-541X.
