= Skyscraper design and construction =

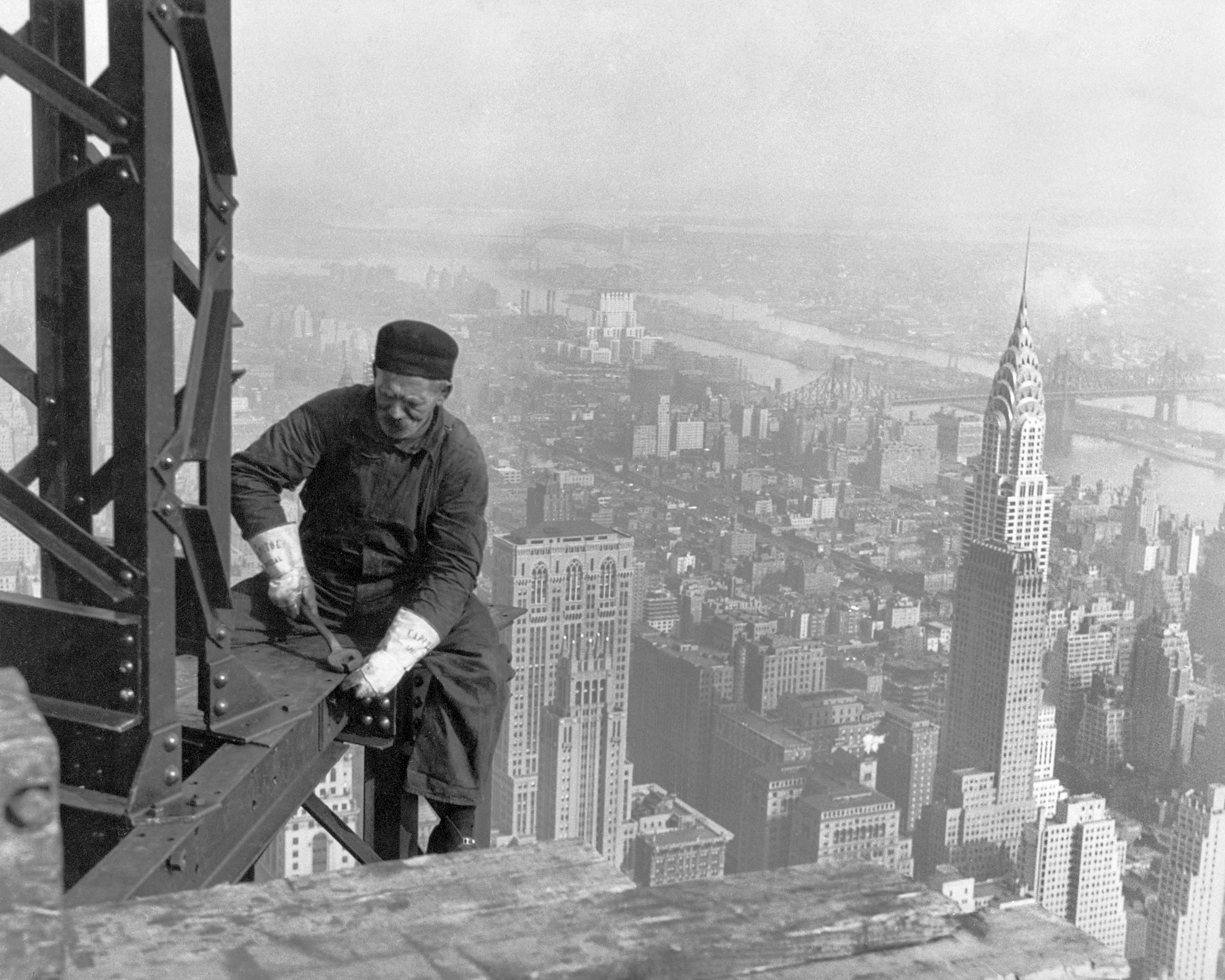
A workman on the framework of the Empire State Building

The design and construction of skyscrapers involves creating safe, habitable spaces in very high buildings. The buildings must support their weight, resist wind and earthquakes, and protect occupants from fire. Yet they must also be conveniently accessible, even on the upper floors, and provide utilities and a comfortable climate for the occupants. The problems posed in skyscraper design are considered among the most complex encountered given the balances required between economics, engineering, and construction management.

== Basic design considerations ==
Good structural design is important in most building designs, but particularly for skyscrapers since even a small chance of catastrophic failure is unacceptable given the high prices of construction and potential risk to human life on a massive scale, as seen in the Surfside condominium collapse of 2021. This presents a paradox to civil engineers: the only way to assure a lack of failure is to test for all modes of failure, in both the laboratory and the real world. But the only way to know of all modes of failure is to learn from previous failures. Thus, no engineer can be absolutely sure that a given structure will resist all loadings that could cause failure, but can only have large enough margins of safety such that a failure is acceptably unlikely. When buildings do fail, engineers question whether the failure was due to some lack of foresight or due to some unknowable factor.

== Substructure ==
One of the many things that make skyscrapers special is their substructure. For example, the depth of the pit that holds the substructure has to reach all the way to bedrock. If bedrock lies close to the surface, the soil on top of the bedrock is removed, and enough of the bedrock surface is removed to form a smooth platform on which to construct the building's foundation.

== Loading and vibration ==
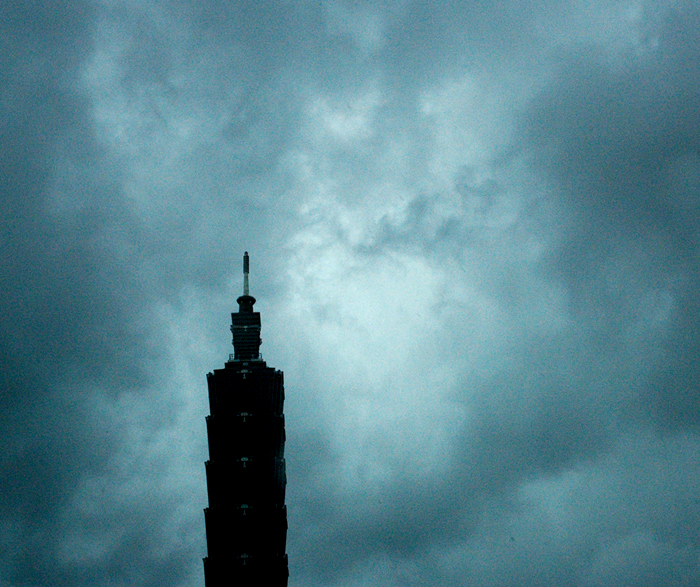
Taipei 101 endures a typhoon (2005)

The load a skyscraper experiences is largely from the force of the building material itself. In most building designs, the weight of the structure is much larger than the weight of the material that it will support beyond its own weight. In technical terms, the dead load, the load of the structure, is larger than the live load, the weight of things in the structure (people, furniture, vehicles, etc.). As such, the amount of structural material required within the lower levels of a skyscraper will be much larger than the material required within higher levels. This is not always visually apparent. The Empire State Building's setbacks are actually a result of the building code at the time, and were not structurally required. On the other hand, John Hancock Center's shape is uniquely the result of how it supports loads. Vertical supports can come in several types, among which the most common for skyscrapers can be categorized as steel frames, concrete cores, tube within tube design, and shear walls.

The wind loading on a skyscraper should also be considered. In fact, the lateral wind load imposed on super-tall structures is generally the governing factor in the structural design. Wind pressure increases with height, so for very tall buildings, the loads associated with wind are larger than dead or live loads.

Other vertical and horizontal loading factors come from varied, unpredictable sources, such as earthquakes.

=== Shear walls ===
A shear wall, in its simplest definition, is a wall where the entire material of the wall is employed in the resistance of both horizontal and vertical loads. A typical example is a brick or cinderblock wall. Since the wall material is used to hold the weight, as the wall expands in size, it must hold considerably more weight. Due to the features of a shear wall, it is acceptable for small constructions, such as suburban housing or an urban brownstone, to require low material costs and little maintenance. In this way, shear walls, typically in the form of plywood and framing, brick, or cinderblock, are used for these structures. For skyscrapers, though, as the size of the structure increases, so does the size of the supporting wall. Large structures such as castles and cathedrals inherently addressed these issues due to a large wall being advantageous (castles), or able to be designed around (cathedrals). Since skyscrapers seek to maximize the floor-space by consolidating structural support, shear walls tend to be used only in conjunction with other support systems.

=== Steel frame ===
The classic concept of a skyscraper is a large steel box with many small boxes inside it. By eliminating the inefficient part of a shear wall, the central portion, and consolidating support members in a much stronger material, steel, a skyscraper could be built with both horizontal and vertical supports throughout. This method, though simple, has drawbacks. Chief among these is that as more material must be supported (as height increases), the distance between supporting members must decrease, which actually, in turn, increases the amount of material that must be supported. This becomes inefficient and uneconomic for buildings above 40 stories tall as usable floor spaces are reduced for supporting columns and due to more usage of steel.

=== Tube frame ===
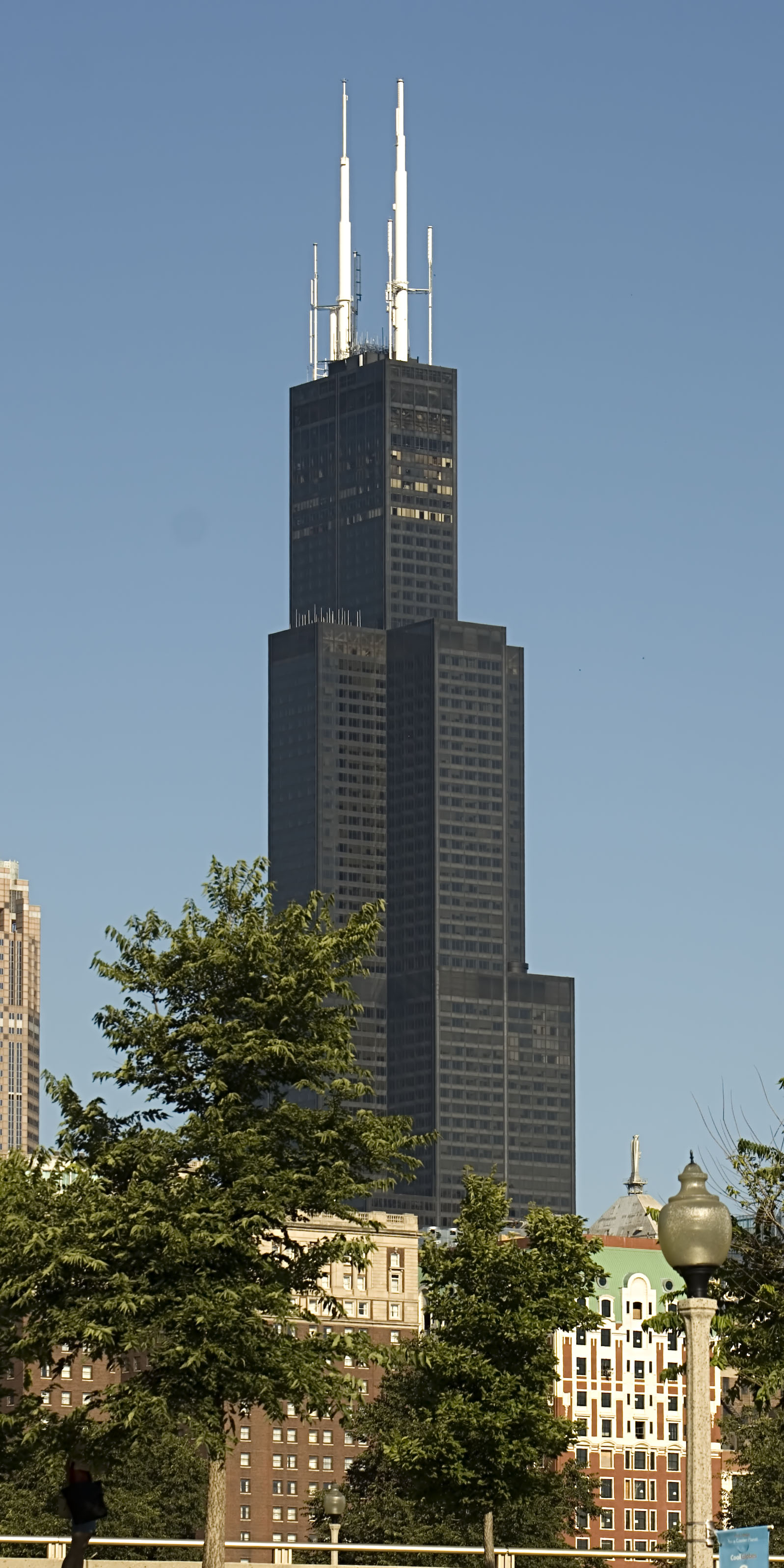
The Willis Tower showing the bundled tube frame design

A new structural system using framed tubes was developed in the early 1960s. Fazlur Khan and J. Rankine defined the framed tube structure as "a three dimensional space structure composed of three, four, or possibly more frames, braced frames, or shear walls, joined at or near their edges to form a vertical tube-like structural system capable of resisting lateral forces in any direction by cantilevering from the foundation." Closely spaced interconnected exterior columns form the tube. Horizontal loads (primarily wind) are supported by the structure as a whole. About half the exterior surface is available for windows. Framed tubes allow fewer interior columns, and so create more usable floor space. Where larger openings like garage doors are required, the tube frame must be interrupted, with transfer girders used to maintain structural integrity. Tube structures cut down costs, at the same time allow buildings to reach greater heights. Tube-frame construction was first used in the DeWitt-Chestnut Apartment Building, designed by Khan and completed in Chicago in 1963. It was used soon after for the John Hancock Center and in the construction of the World Trade Center.

A variation on the tube frame is the bundled tube, which uses several interconnected tube frames. The Willis Tower in Chicago used this design, employing nine tubes of varying height to achieve its distinct appearance. The bundled tube design was not only highly efficient in economic terms, but it was also "innovative in its potential for versatile formulation of architectural space. Efficient towers no longer had to be box-like; the tube-units could take on various shapes and could be bundled together in different sorts of groupings." The bundled tube structure meant that "buildings no longer need be boxlike in appearance: they could become sculpture." Cities have experienced a huge surge in skyscraper construction, thanks to Khan's innovations allowing economical skyscrapers.

The tubular systems are fundamental to tall building design. Most buildings over 40-stories constructed since the 1960s now use a tube design derived from Khan's structural engineering principles, examples including the construction of the World Trade Center, Aon Center, Petronas Towers, Jin Mao Building, and most other supertall skyscrapers since the 1960s. The strong influence of tube structure design is also evident in the construction of the current tallest skyscraper, the Burj Khalifa.

== Elevators ==
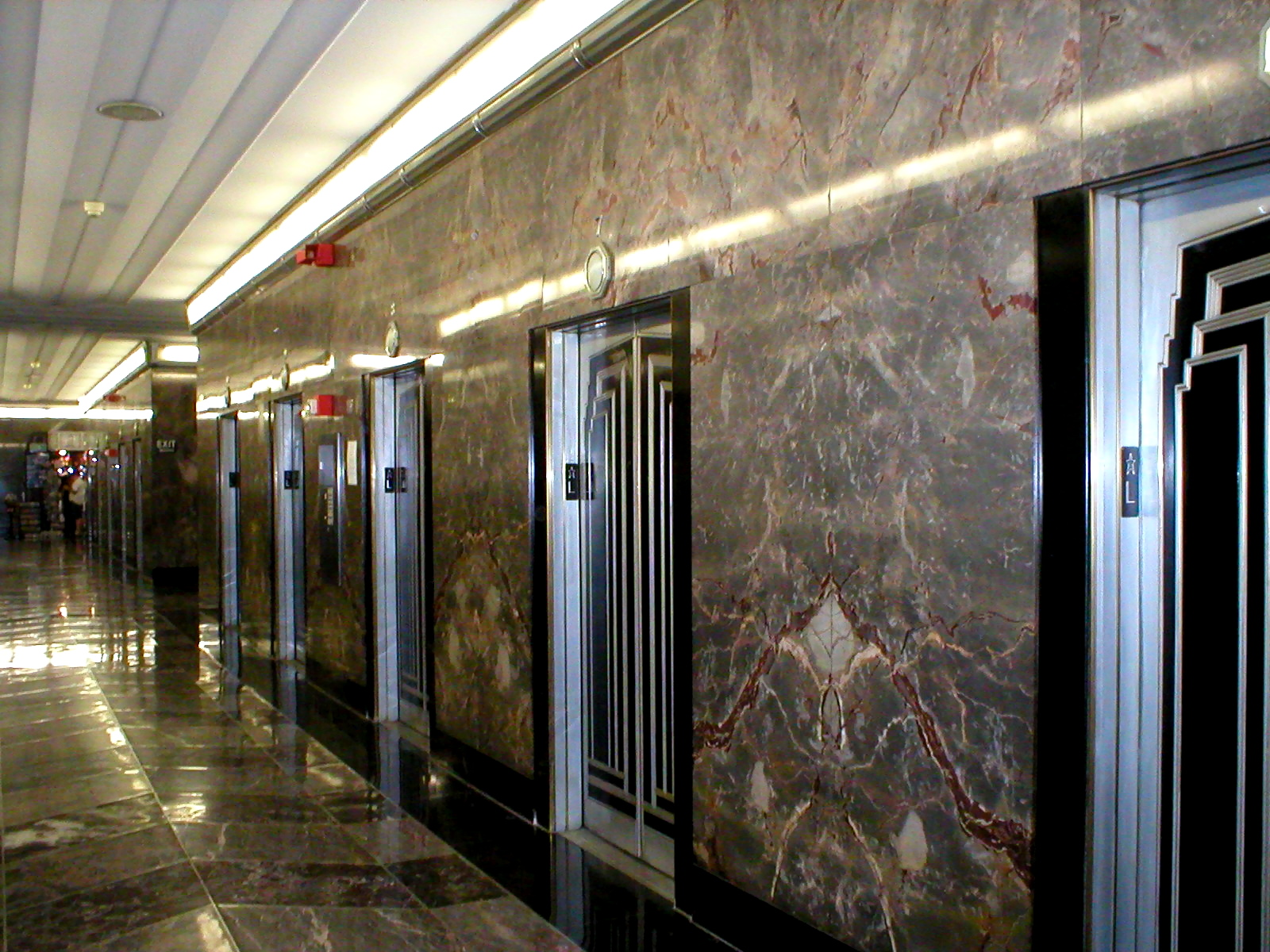
Elevators in the Empire State Building

The invention of the elevator was a precondition for the invention of skyscrapers, given that most people would not (or could not) climb more than a few flights of stairs at a time. The elevators in a skyscraper are not simply a necessary utility like running water and electricity, but are in fact closely related to the design of the whole structure. A taller building requires more elevators to service the additional floors, but the elevator shafts consume valuable floor space. If the service core (which contains the elevator shafts) becomes too big, it can reduce the profitability of the building. Architects must therefore balance the value gained by adding height against the value lost to the expanding service core. Many tall buildings use elevators in a non-standard configuration to reduce their footprint. Buildings such as the former World Trade Center's Twin Towers and Chicago's John Hancock Center use sky lobbies, where express elevators take passengers to upper floors which serve as the base for local elevators. This allows architects and engineers to place elevator shafts on top of each other, saving space. Sky lobbies and express elevators take up a significant amount of space and add to the amount of time spent commuting between floors. Other buildings such as the Petronas Towers use double-deck elevators allowing more people to fit in a single elevator and reaching two floors at every stop. It is possible to use even more than two levels on an elevator although this has yet to be tried. The main problem with double-deck elevators is that they cause all elevator occupants to stop when only people on one level need to get off at a given floor.

Another solution, employed by the Shanghai Tower and the under-construction (2019) Jeddah Tower is for buildings to be created for mixed-use, putting office space in the lower floors as it uses more floorspace. Multistory penthouses and atria—which require little cross-sectional floorspace—are placed towards the top.

== Other difficulties when building skyscrapers ==
Building skyscrapers can be difficult due to factors other than complexity and cost. For example, in European cities like Paris, the difference between the appearance of old architecture and modern skyscrapers can make it hard to get approval from local authorities to construct new skyscrapers. Building skyscrapers in an old town can drastically alter the image of the city. In cities such as London in the United Kingdom or San Francisco in the United States, there is a legal requirement called protected view, which limits the height of new buildings within or adjacent to the sightline between the two places involved. This rule also makes it harder to find suitable sites for new tall buildings.

== See also ==
- List of architects of supertall buildings
- List of cities with most skyscrapers
- Plyscraper
- Seascraper
