= Fazlur Rahman Khan =

Bangladeshi architect (1929–1982)

- ফজলুর রহমান খান
- Born: 3 April 1929; Dhaka, Bengal Presidency, British India
- Died: 27 March 1982 (aged 52); Jeddah, Saudi Arabia
- Resting place: Graceland Cemetery, Chicago
- Citizenship: British Indian (1929–1947) Pakistani (1947–1971); Bangladeshi (after 1971); American
- Education: IIEST Shibpur; Bangladesh University of Engineering and Technology (BSc); University of Illinois Urbana-Champaign (MS, PhD)
- Spouse: Liselotte Khan
- Children: Yasmin Sabina Khan
- Relatives: Abdul Jabbar Khan (sister's father-in-law); A.Z.M. Enayetullah Khan (brother-in-law)
- Engineering career
- Discipline: Architectural, civil, structural
- Significant design: John Hancock Center, Willis Tower, Hajj Terminal, King Abdulaziz University, One Magnificent Mile, Onterie Center
- Awards: Aga Khan Award for Architecture; Independence Award; AIA Honor for Distinguished Achievement

Fazlur Rahman Khan (Bengali: ফজলুর রহমান খান, Fazlur Rôhman Khan; 3 April 1929 – 27 March 1982) was a Bangladeshi-American structural engineer and architect who initiated important structural systems for skyscrapers. Considered the "father of tubular designs" for high-rises, Khan was also a pioneer in computer-aided design (CAD). He was the designer of the Sears Tower, since renamed Willis Tower, the tallest building in the world from 1973 until 1998, and the 100-story John Hancock Center.

A partner in the firm Skidmore, Owings & Merrill in Chicago, Khan, more than any other individual, ushered in a renaissance in skyscraper construction during the second half of the 20th century. He has been called the "Einstein of structural engineering" and the "Greatest Structural Engineer of the 20th Century" for his innovative use of structural systems that remain fundamental to modern skyscraper design and construction. In his honor, the Council on Tall Buildings and Urban Habitat established the Fazlur Khan Lifetime Achievement Medal as one of their CTBUH Skyscraper Awards.

Although best known for skyscrapers, Khan was also an active designer of other kinds of structures, including the Hajj airport terminal, the McMath–Pierce solar telescope, and several stadium structures.

== Family and background ==
Fazlur Rahman Khan was born on 3 April 1929 to a Bengali Muslim family in Dhaka, Bengal Presidency (present-day Bangladesh). He was from and brought up in the Khan Bari of Bhandarikandi in Madaripur, Faridpur District. His father, Khan Bahadur Abdur Rahman Khan, was a high school mathematics teacher and textbook author who eventually became the Director of Public Instruction in Bengal and, after retirement, served as the first principal of Jagannath College. His mother, Khadijah Khatun, was the daughter of Abdul Basit Chowdhury, the Zamindar (aristocratic landowner) of Dulai in Pabna, who traced his ancestry to a migrant from Samarkand in Turkestan. Khan's paternal uncle, Abdul Hakim Khan, was the son-in-law of Syed Abdul Jabbar, a zamindar based in Comilla.

== Early life and education ==
Khan attended Armanitola Government High School in Dhaka. After that, he studied civil engineering at Bengal Engineering and Science University, Shibpur (present day Indian Institute of Engineering Science and Technology, Shibpur), Kolkata, India, and then received his Bachelor of Civil Engineering degree from Ahsanullah Engineering College (now Bangladesh University of Engineering and Technology). He received a Fulbright Scholarship and a government scholarship, which enabled him to travel to the United States in 1952. There he studied at the University of Illinois at Urbana–Champaign. In three years Khan earned two master's degrees – one in structural engineering and one in theoretical and applied mechanics – and a PhD in structural engineering with a thesis titled Analytical Study of Relations Among Various Design Criteria for Rectangular Prestressed Concrete Beams.

His hometown in Dhaka did not have any buildings taller than three stories. He did not view his first skyscraper in person until the age of 21, and he had not stepped inside a mid-rise building until he moved to the United States for graduate school. Despite this, the environment of his hometown in Dhaka later influenced his tube building concept, which was inspired by the bamboo that sprouted around Dhaka. He found that a hollow tube, like the bamboo in Dhaka, lent a high-rise vertical durability.

=== Career ===
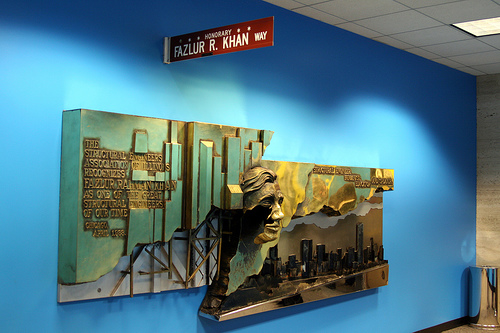
A sculpture honoring Fazlur Khan at the Willis Tower

In 1955, employed by the architectural firm Skidmore, Owings & Merrill (SOM), he began working in Chicago. He was made a partner in 1966. He worked the rest of his life side by side with fellow architect Bruce Graham. Khan introduced design methods and concepts for efficient use of material in building architecture. His first building to employ the tube structure was the Chestnut De-Witt apartment building. During the 1960s and 1970s, he became noted for his designs for Chicago's 100-story John Hancock Center and 110-story Sears Tower, since renamed Willis Tower, the tallest building in the world from 1973 until 1998.

He believed that engineers needed a broader perspective on life, saying, "The technical man must not be lost in his own technology; he must be able to appreciate life, and life is art, drama, music, and most importantly, people."

Khan's personal papers, most of which were in his office at the time of his death, are held by the Ryerson & Burnham Libraries at the Art Institute of Chicago. The Fazlur Khan Collection includes manuscripts, sketches, audio cassette tapes, slides, and other materials regarding his work.

=== Personal life ===
For enjoyment, Khan loved singing Rabindranath Tagore's poetic songs in Bengali. He and his wife, Liselotte, an immigrant from Austria, had one daughter who was born in 1960. In 1967, he elected to become a United States citizen. Khan was a Muslim at the time when he died.

== Innovations ==
Khan discovered that the rigid steel frame structure that had long dominated tall building design was not the only system fitting for tall buildings, marking the start of a new era of skyscraper construction.

=== Tube structural systems ===
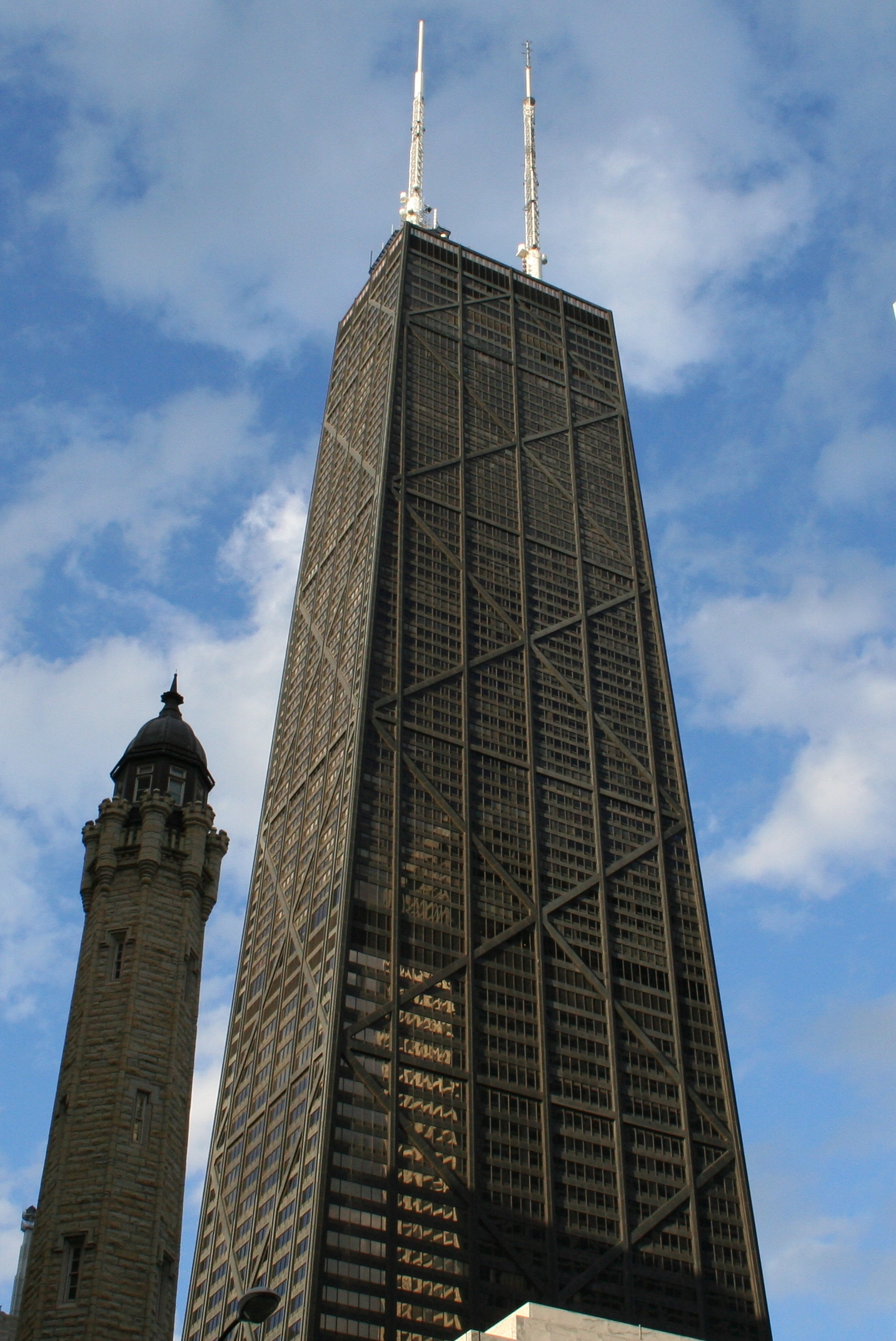
The John Hancock Center is the world's first mixed use tower. When built, it was the second tallest building in the world. It demonstrated how much more efficient and feasible building very tall skyscrapers could be in comparison to the older design and technology used by the tallest buildings up to that time.

Khan's central innovation in skyscraper design and construction was the idea of the "tube" structural system for tall buildings, including the framed tube, trussed tube, and bundled tube variants. His "tube concept", using all the exterior wall perimeter structure of a building to simulate a thin-walled tube, revolutionized tall building design. Most buildings over 40 stories constructed since the 1960s now use a tube design derived from Khan's structural engineering principles.

Lateral loads (horizontal forces) such as wind forces, seismic forces, etc., begin to dominate the structural system and take on increasing importance in the overall building system as the building height increases. Wind forces become very substantial, and forces caused by earthquakes, etc., are important as well. The tubular designs resist such forces for tall buildings. Tube structures are stiff and have significant advantages over other framing systems. They not only make the buildings structurally stronger and more efficient, but also significantly reduce the structural material requirements. The reduction of material makes the buildings economically more efficient and reduces environmental impact. The tubular designs enable buildings to reach even greater heights. Tubular systems allow greater interior space and further enable buildings to take on various shapes, offering added freedom to architects. These new designs opened an economic door for contractors, engineers, architects, and investors, providing vast amounts of real estate space on minimal plots of land. Khan was among a group of engineers who encouraged a rebirth in skyscraper construction after a hiatus of over thirty years.

The tubular systems have yet to reach their limit when it comes to height. Another important feature of the tubular systems is that buildings can be constructed using steel or reinforced concrete, or a composite of the two, to reach greater heights. Khan pioneered the use of lightweight concrete for high-rise buildings, at a time when reinforced concrete was used for mostly low-rise construction of only a few stories in height. Most of Khan's designs were conceived considering pre-fabrication and repetition of components so projects could be quickly built with minimal errors.

The population explosion, starting with the baby boom of the 1950s, created widespread concern about the amount of available living space, which Khan solved by building upward. More than any other 20th-century engineer, Fazlur Rahman Khan made it possible for people to live and work in "cities in the sky". Mark Sarkisian (Director of Structural and Seismic Engineering at Skidmore, Owings & Merrill) said, "Khan was a visionary who transformed skyscrapers into sky cities while staying firmly grounded in the fundamentals of engineering."

=== Framed tube ===
Since 1963, the new structural system of framed tubes has become highly influential in skyscraper design and construction. Khan defined the framed tube structure as "a three dimensional space structure composed of three, four, or possibly more frames, braced frames, or shear walls, joined at or near their edges to form a vertical tube-like structural system capable of resisting lateral forces in any direction by cantilevering from the foundation." Closely spaced interconnected exterior columns form the tube. Horizontal loads, for example from wind and earthquakes, are supported by the structure as a whole. About half the exterior surface is available for windows. Framed tubes allow fewer interior columns, and so create more usable floor space. The bundled tube structure is more efficient for tall buildings, lessening the penalty for height. The structural system also allows the interior columns to be smaller and the core of the building to be free of braced frames or shear walls that use valuable floor space. Where larger openings like garage doors are required, the tube frame must be interrupted, with transfer girders used to maintain structural integrity.

The first building to apply the tube-frame construction was the DeWitt-Chestnut Apartment Building, since renamed Plaza on DeWitt. The building that Bruce Graham designed and Khan did the engineering for was completed in Chicago in 1963. This laid the foundations for the framed tube structure used in the construction of the World Trade Center.

=== Trussed tube and X-bracing ===
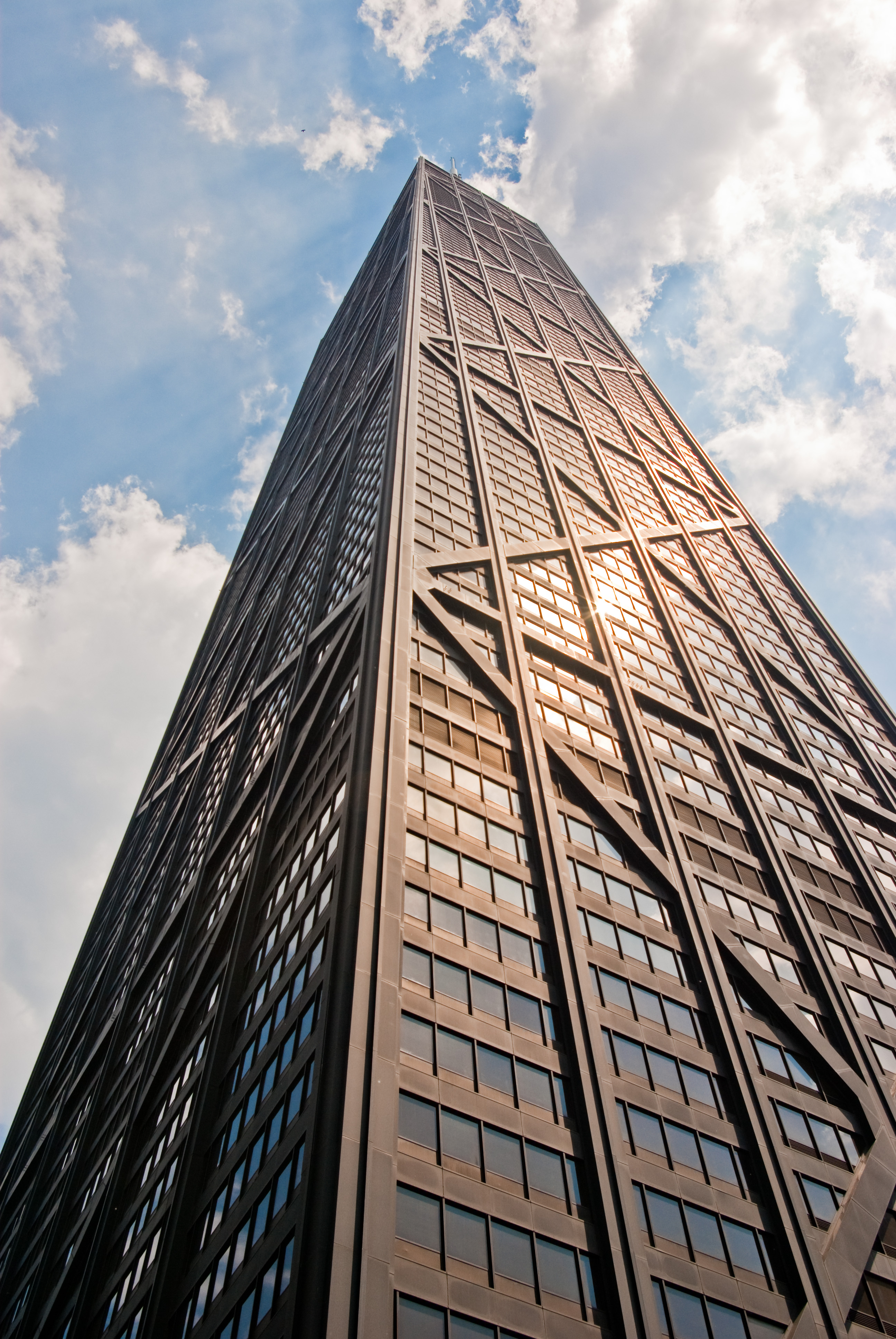
In 1960, buildings over 20 stories were still newsworthy. Apartments in the John Hancock Center in Chicago – shown here with its distinctive exterior X-bracing – are located as high as the 90th floor.

Khan pioneered several other variants of the tube structure design. One of these was the concept of applying X-bracing to the exterior of the tube to form a trussed tube. X-bracing reduces the lateral load on a building by transferring the load into the exterior columns, and the reduced need for interior columns provides a greater usable floor space. Khan first employed exterior X-bracing in his engineering of the John Hancock Center in 1965, and this can be clearly seen on the building's exterior, making it an architectural icon.

In contrast to earlier steel frame structures, such as the Empire State Building (1931), which required about 206 kilograms of steel per square meter, and One Chase Manhattan Plaza (1961), which required around 275 kilograms of steel per square meter, the John Hancock Center was far more efficient, requiring only 145 kilograms of steel per square meter. The trussed tube concept was applied to many later skyscrapers, including the Onterie Center, Citigroup Center, and Bank of China Tower.

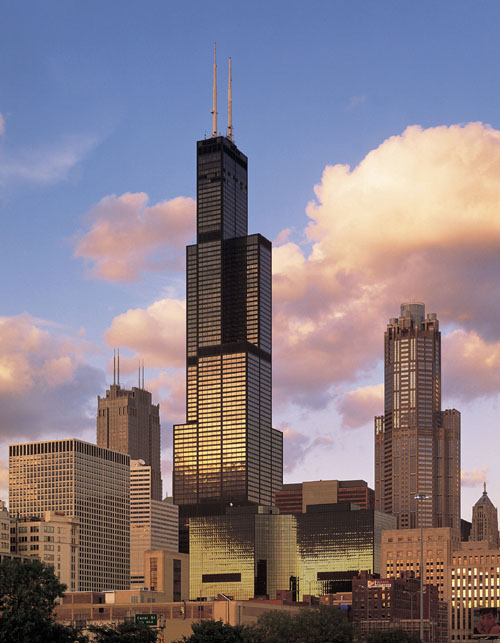
Willis Tower, engineered by Khan and designed by Bruce Graham, was the tallest building in the world for 25 years. The design introduced the bundled tube structural system.

=== Bundle tube ===
One of Khan's most important variants of the tube structure concept was the bundled tube, which was used for the Willis Tower and One Magnificent Mile. The bundled tube design was not only the most efficient in economic terms, but it was also "innovative in its potential for versatile formulation of architectural space. Efficient towers no longer had to be box-like; the tube-units could take on various shapes and could be bundled together in different sorts of groupings."

=== Tube-in-tube ===
The Tube-in-tube system takes advantage of core shear wall tubes in addition to exterior tubes. The inner tube and outer tube work together to resist gravity loads and lateral loads and to provide additional rigidity to the structure to prevent significant deflections at the top. This design was first used in One Shell Plaza. Later buildings to use this structural system include the Petronas Towers.

=== Outrigger and belt truss ===
The outrigger and belt truss system is a lateral load resisting system in which the tube structure is connected to the central core wall with very stiff outriggers and belt trusses at one or more levels. BHP House was the first building to use this structural system, followed by the First Wisconsin Center, since renamed U.S. Bank Center, in Milwaukee. The center rises 601 feet, with three belt trusses at the bottom, middle, and top of the building. The exposed belt trusses serve aesthetic and structural purposes. Later buildings to use this include the Shanghai World Financial Center.

=== Concrete tube structures ===
The last major buildings engineered by Khan were the One Magnificent Mile and Onterie Center in Chicago, which employed his bundled tube and trussed tube system designs, respectively. In contrast to his earlier buildings, which were mainly steel, his last two buildings were concrete. His earlier DeWitt-Chestnut Apartments building, built in 1963 in Chicago, was also a concrete building with a tube structure. Trump Tower in New York City is another example that adapted this system.

=== Shear wall frame interaction system ===
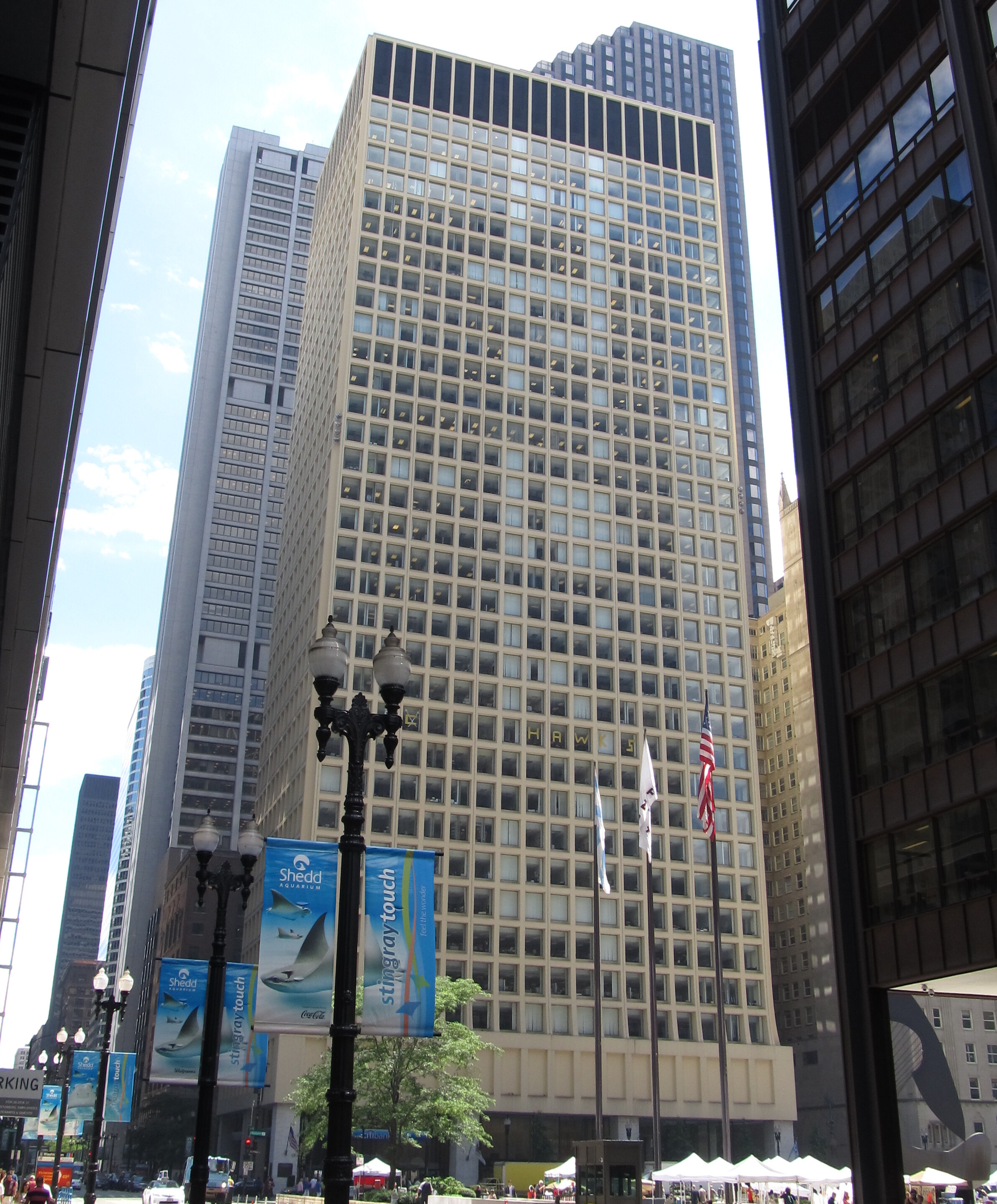
Cook County Administration Building in Chicago (originally known as the "Brunswick Building"), the first building to utilize Khan's shear wall frame interaction system

Khan developed the shear wall frame interaction system for mid high-rise buildings. This structural system uses combinations of shear walls and frames designed to resist lateral forces. The first building to use this structural system was the 35-stories Brunswick Building. The Brunswick building was completed in 1965 and became the tallest reinforced concrete structure of its time. The structural system of the Brunswick Building consists of a concrete shear wall core surrounded by an outer concrete frame of columns and spandrels. Apartment buildings up to 70 stories high have successfully used this concept.

=== Legacy ===
Khan's seminal work on developing tall building structural systems is still used today as the starting point when considering design options for tall buildings. Tube structures have since been used in many skyscrapers, including the construction of the World Trade Center, Aon Center, Petronas Towers, Jin Mao Building, Bank of China Tower, and most other buildings in excess of 40 stories constructed since the 1960s. The strong influence of tube structure design is also evident in the world's current tallest skyscraper, the Burj Khalifa in Dubai. According to Stephen Bayley of The Daily Telegraph:

Khan invented a new way of building tall. ... So Fazlur Khan created the unconventional skyscraper. Reversing the logic of the steel frame, he decided that the building's external envelope could – given enough trussing, framing and bracing – be the structure itself. This made buildings even lighter. The "bundled tube" meant buildings no longer need be boxlike in appearance: they could become sculpture. Khan's amazing insight – he was name-checked by Obama in his Cairo University speech last year – changed both the economics and the morphology of supertall buildings. And it made Burj Khalifa possible: proportionately, Burj employs perhaps half the steel that conservatively supports the Empire State Building. ... Burj Khalifa is the ultimate expression of his audacious, lightweight design philosophy.

== Life cycle civil engineering ==
Khan and Mark Fintel conceived ideas of shock absorbing soft-stories for protecting structures from abnormal loading, particularly strong earthquakes, over a long period of time. This concept was a precursor to modern seismic isolation systems. The structures are designed to behave naturally during earthquakes, where traditional concepts of material ductility are replaced by mechanisms that allow for movement during ground shaking while protecting material elasticity.

The IALCCE established the Fazlur R. Khan Life-Cycle Civil Engineering Medal.

== Other architectural work ==
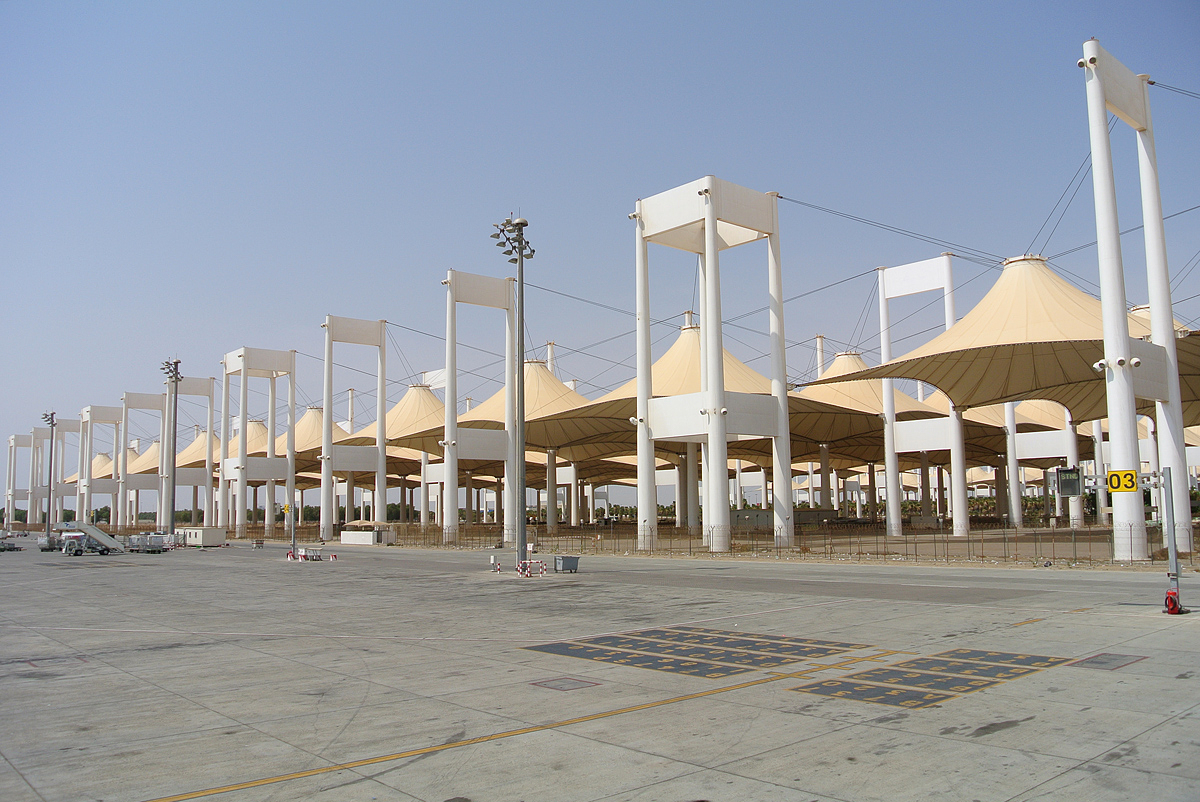
Hajj Terminal at Jeddah airport

Khan designed several notable structures that are not skyscrapers. Examples include the Hajj terminal of King Abdulaziz International Airport, completed in 1981, which consists of tent-like roofs that are folded up when not in use. The project received several awards, including the Aga Khan Award for Architecture, which described it as an "outstanding contribution to architecture for Muslims". The tent-like tensile structures advanced the theory and technology of fabric as a structural material and led the way to its use for other types of terminals and large spaces.

Khan also designed the King Abdulaziz University, the United States Air Force Academy in Colorado Springs, and the Hubert H. Humphrey Metrodome in Minneapolis. With Bruce Graham, Khan developed a cable-stayed roof system for the Baxter Travenol Laboratories in Deerfield, Illinois.

== Computers for structural engineering and architecture ==
In the 1970s, engineers were just starting to use computer structural analysis on a large scale. SOM was at the center of these new developments, with undeniable contributions from Khan. Graham and Khan lobbied SOM partners to purchase a mainframe computer, a risky investment at a time when new technologies were just starting to form. The partners agreed, and Khan began programming the system to calculate structural engineering equations, and, later, to develop architectural drawings.

== Professional milestones ==
=== List of buildings ===
Buildings on which Khan was structural engineer include:

- McMath–Pierce solar telescope, Kitt Peak National Observatory, Arizona, 1962
- DeWitt-Chestnut Apartments, Chicago, 1963
- Brunswick Building, Chicago, 1965
- John Hancock Center, Chicago, 1965–1969
- One Shell Square, New Orleans, Louisiana, 1972
- 140 William Street (formerly BHP House), Melbourne, 1972
- Sears Tower, renamed Willis Tower, Chicago, 1970–1973
- First Wisconsin Center, renamed U.S. Bank Center, Milwaukee, 1973
- Hajj Terminal, King Abdulaziz International Airport, Jeddah, 1974–1980
- King Abdulaziz University, Jeddah, 1977–1978
- Hubert H. Humphrey Metrodome, Minneapolis, Minnesota, 1982
- One Magnificent Mile, Chicago, completed 1983
- Onterie Center, Chicago, completed 1986
- United States Air Force Academy, Colorado Springs, Colorado

=== Awards and chair ===
Among Khan's other accomplishments, he received the Wason Medal (1971) and Alfred Lindau Award (1973) from the American Concrete Institute (ACI); the Thomas Middlebrooks Award (1972) and the Ernest Howard Award (1977) from ASCE; the Kimbrough Medal (1973) from the American Institute of Steel Construction; the Oscar Faber medal (1973) from the Institution of Structural Engineers, London; the International Award of Merit in Structural Engineering (1983) from the International Association for Bridge and Structural Engineering IABSE; the AIA Institute Honor for Distinguished Achievement (1983) from the American Institute of Architects; and the John Parmer Award (1987) from Structural Engineers Association of Illinois and Illinois Engineering Hall of Fame from Illinois Engineering Council (2006).

Khan was cited five times by Engineering News-Record as among those who served the best interests of the construction industry, and in 1972 he was honored with ENR's Man of the Year award. In 1973 he was elected to the National Academy of Engineering. He received honorary doctorates from Northwestern University, Lehigh University, and the Swiss Federal Institute of Technology Zürich (ETH Zurich).

The Council on Tall Buildings and Urban Habitat named one of their CTBUH Skyscraper Awards the Fazlur Khan Lifetime Achievement Medal after him, and other awards have been established in his honor, along with a chair at Lehigh University. Promoting educational activities and research, the Fazlur Rahman Khan Endowed Chair of Structural Engineering and Architecture honors Khan's legacy of engineering advancement and architectural sensibility. Dan Frangopol is the first holder of the chair.

Khan was mentioned by President Obama in 2009 in his speech in Cairo, Egypt, when he cited the achievements of America's Muslim citizens.

Khan was the subject of the Google Doodle on 3 April 2017, marking what would have been his 88th birthday.

== Documentary film ==
In 2021, director Laila Kazmi began production on a feature-length documentary film to be called Reaching New Heights: Fazlur Rahman Khan and the Skyscraper on the life and legacy of Khan. The film is produced by Kazmi's production company, Kazbar Media, with development support from ITVS, which provides co-production support to independent documentaries on PBS. The film is helmed by director and producer Laila Kazmi, with associate producer Arnila Guha, and New York-based art director Begoña Lopez. It is fiscally sponsored by Film Independent.

== Charity ==
In 1971 the Bangladesh Liberation War broke out. Khan was heavily involved with creating public opinion and garnering emergency funding for Bengali people during the war. He created the Chicago-based Bangladesh Emergency Welfare Appeal organization.

== Death ==
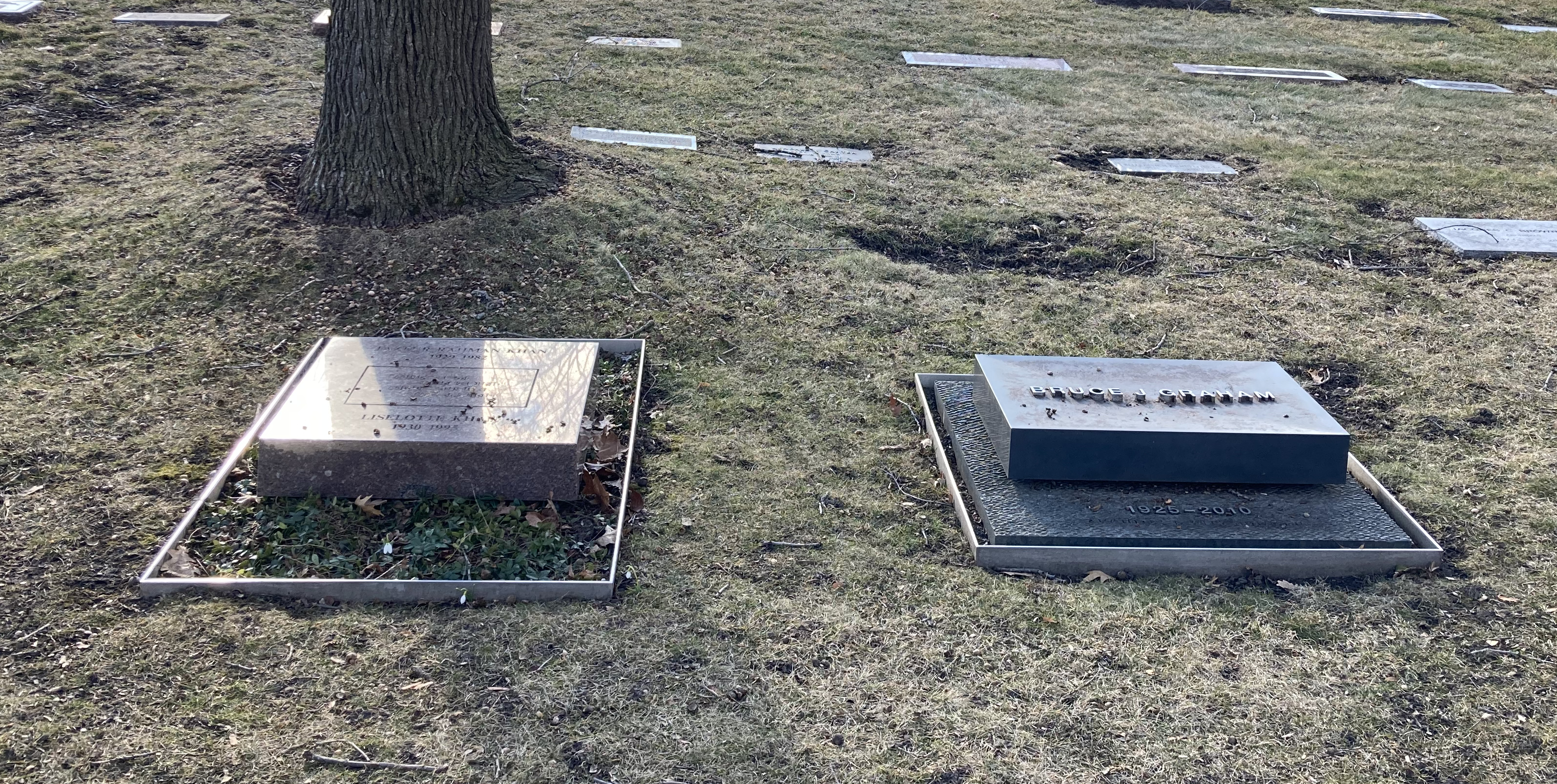
Graves of Khan and Bruce Graham at Graceland Cemetery

Khan died of a heart attack on 27 March 1982 while on a trip in Jeddah, Saudi Arabia, at the age of 52, at which time he was a general partner in SOM. His body was returned to the United States and was buried in Graceland Cemetery in Chicago.

== See also ==
- Chicago school
- Engineering Legends, a 2005 book
- List of Bangladeshi architects
