= One Magnificent Mile =

Skyscraper in Chicago, Illinois

Coordinates: 41.9005°N 87.6247°W

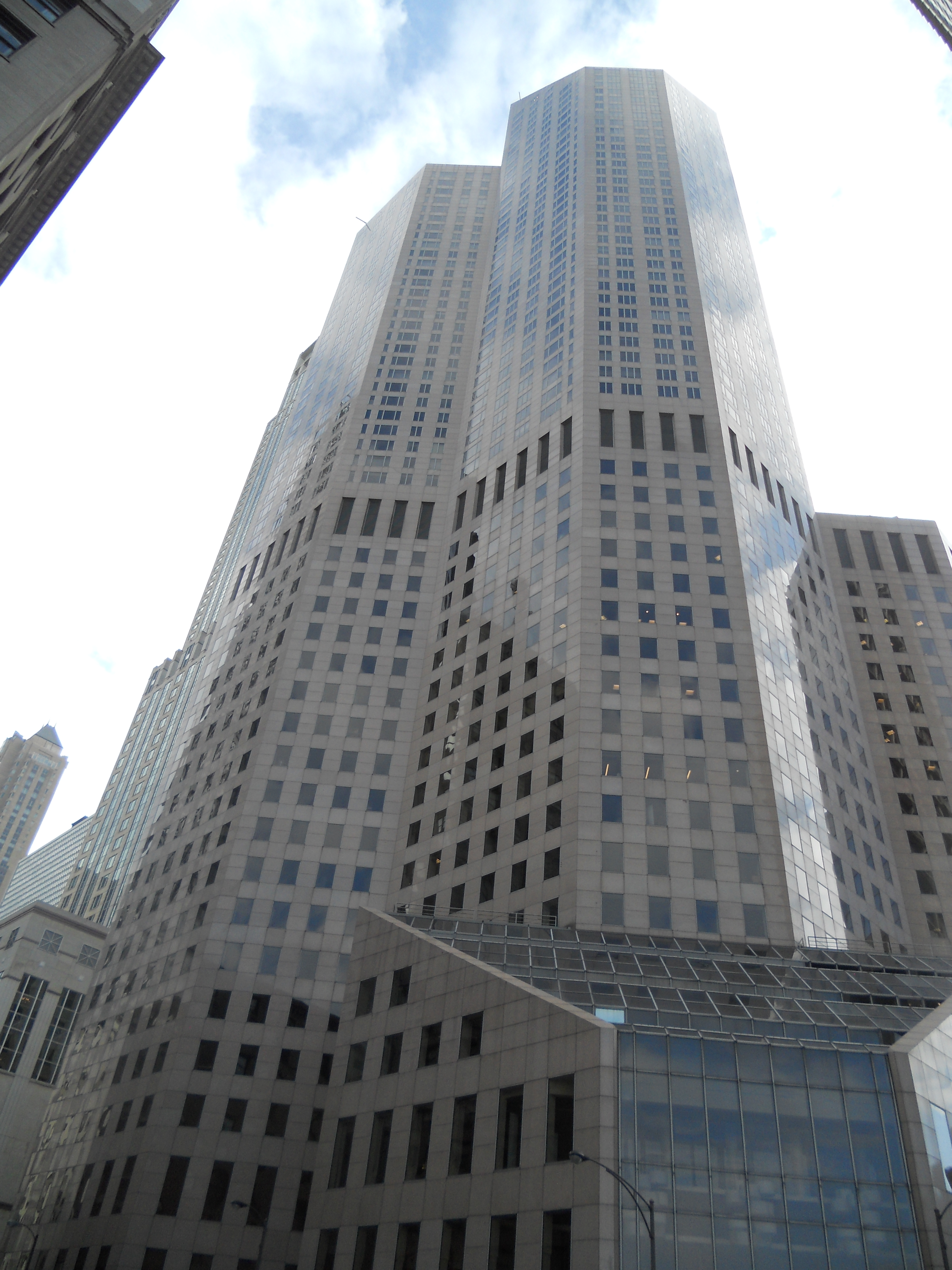
- One Magnificent Mile
- Interactive map of the One Magnificent Mile area

General information
- Status: Completed
- Type: Residential
- Architectural style: Modernism
- Location: 940-980 North Michigan Avenue; Chicago, IL United States
- Completed: 1983

Height
- Height: 673.01 ft (205 m)

Technical details
- Floor count: 57

Design and construction
- Architecture firm: Skidmore, Owings and Merrill

One Magnificent Mile (or One Mag Mile) is a mixed-use high-rise tower completed in 1983 at the northern end of Michigan Avenue on the Magnificent Mile in Chicago containing upscale retailers on the ground floor, followed by office space above that and luxury condominium apartments on top. The 57-storey building was designed by Skidmore, Owings & Merrill and at the time of construction was the tenth-tallest building in Chicago.

One Magnificent Mile Condominium Association, also known as One Mag Mile or One Magnificent Mile, is a mixed-use retail, office and residential skyscraper in downtown Chicago, Illinois. The building was aptly named after its location at the head of the Magnificent Mile shopping corridor immediately adjacent to the exclusive Oak Street shops.

The 57-story building has 58,734 square feet of retail space on the first three levels, and 341,470 square feet of office space on its middle floors 4 through 19. The mechanicals for the entire structure are housed on floors 20 and 21 along with a swim club and fitness center serving the 181 private residences on floors 22–56. The lower level and sub-basement contain a parking garage.

== Design and architecture ==
The building was designed by Skidmore, Owings & Merrill with Colombian-American lead architect Bruce Graham. The 57-story Spanish pink granite clad structure reaches a height of 673 feet, which at time of construction was the 10th tallest building in Chicago. Renowned Bangladeshi-American structural engineer Fazlur Rahman Khan who previously engineered the John Hancock Building and Sears Tower is responsible for the unique tube system. In 1984, this building won the Best Structure Award from the Structural Engineers Association of Illinois.

The building is actually four hexagonal reinforced concrete tube structures of differing heights linked in a bundled configuration, the tube heights reach 5, 21, 49 and 57 floors. Each of the tubes has a sloping roof. Penthouse units feature greenhouses and outdoor terraces. Each hexagonal tube is designed with two 90-degree and four 45-degree corners which allow the building to face Lake Michigan and Oak Street Beach, while remaining aligned with Walton Street, Michigan Avenue and Oak Street. The tubes' heights were calculated to minimize afternoon shadows on the beach.

== The residences ==
The residential portion of the building is known as “One Magnificent Mile Condominium Association” and is entered in the center of the block on the Michigan Avenue frontage. The building is one of only a handful of buildings that has its actual entrance directly on Michigan Avenue. From an all glass outer lobby you can enter the receiving lobby which also includes reception desk, and an elevator to the garage and retail portion of the building. A secure inner lobby provides express elevator service to the residences on floor 22–56.

The building features only six residences per floor on floors 22–47, four residences on floor 48–49 and three only residences on floors 50–56. Residences range in size from a 1,680-square-foot one-bedroom up to 3,000 square feet for the standard four-bedroom. In many of the apartments one room is a pentagon, allowing the remaining space in each unit to fit 90° angles. Most of the residences feature master bedroom suites configured with dual bathrooms and closets. The building includes some of the city's most dramatic penthouses and duplexes near the top of the building. Many feature greenhouse windows and broad terraces along the sloping roof line near the top of the building.

== Building amenities ==
Since opening, the building has been home to Spiaggia and Café Spiaggia two award-winning Italian restaurant dining rooms, headed by James Beard Award winner Tony Mantuano, a chef who is known for defining true Italian cuisine in the United States. The main dining room was closed for renovation and re-opened for its 30-year anniversary. The Café was closed and reopened after renovation in 2015. The commercial/retail portion also includes a Regus staffed office facility; Delle Amiche Hair/Nail Salon; Tods leather goods, and Morgenthal Frederics ultra high-end optical.

== Location and history ==
Located at the inside corner of the Gold Coast where Lake Shore Drive turns east and the "Magnificent Mile" (Michigan Avenue's glamorous shopping and hotel district) begins. The buildings unique design allows it to face Oak Street Beach while remaining parallel to the street. Prior to the start of construction, the building site comprised parcels that included the 936 North Michigan Avenue building, a classic limestone four story office/retail building which housed Trabert & Hoeffer jewelers (now around the corner on Oak Street) a shoe store and a Fannie May candy store. There was a surface parking lot at the northeast corner. The westernmost area on Walton Street was the site of the original Playboy Club circa 1960–1974. Demolition of the existing buildings began in 1978 with excavation and foundation work following shortly after. The building's construction barricade is captured in the popular 1981 movie Risky Business during the car chase scene. The building's initial opening was in 1983, with limited office and retail tenants followed by the residences opening in 1984. Upon its final completion, demolition ensued across on the street on the 63-story 900 North Michigan mixed use project which was completed in 1989.

When the building originally opened, it housed the exclusive specialty department store: Stanley Korshak on the first three levels of the southeast corner, POLO by Ralph Lauren on the Michigan Avenue façade, Optica and The United Colors of Benetton fronting on Oak Street. The office space was home to popular 1980's advertising agency Tatham-Laird & Kudner, and the corporate headquarters for Beecham Cosmetics, makers of labels such as Jovan, and Yardley of London.

== Awards ==
Best Structure, Structural Engineers Association of Illinois

== See also ==
- Chicago architecture
- 50 Tallest buildings in the U.S.
- List of tallest buildings in Chicago
- List of towers
- World's tallest structures
