= X-bracing =

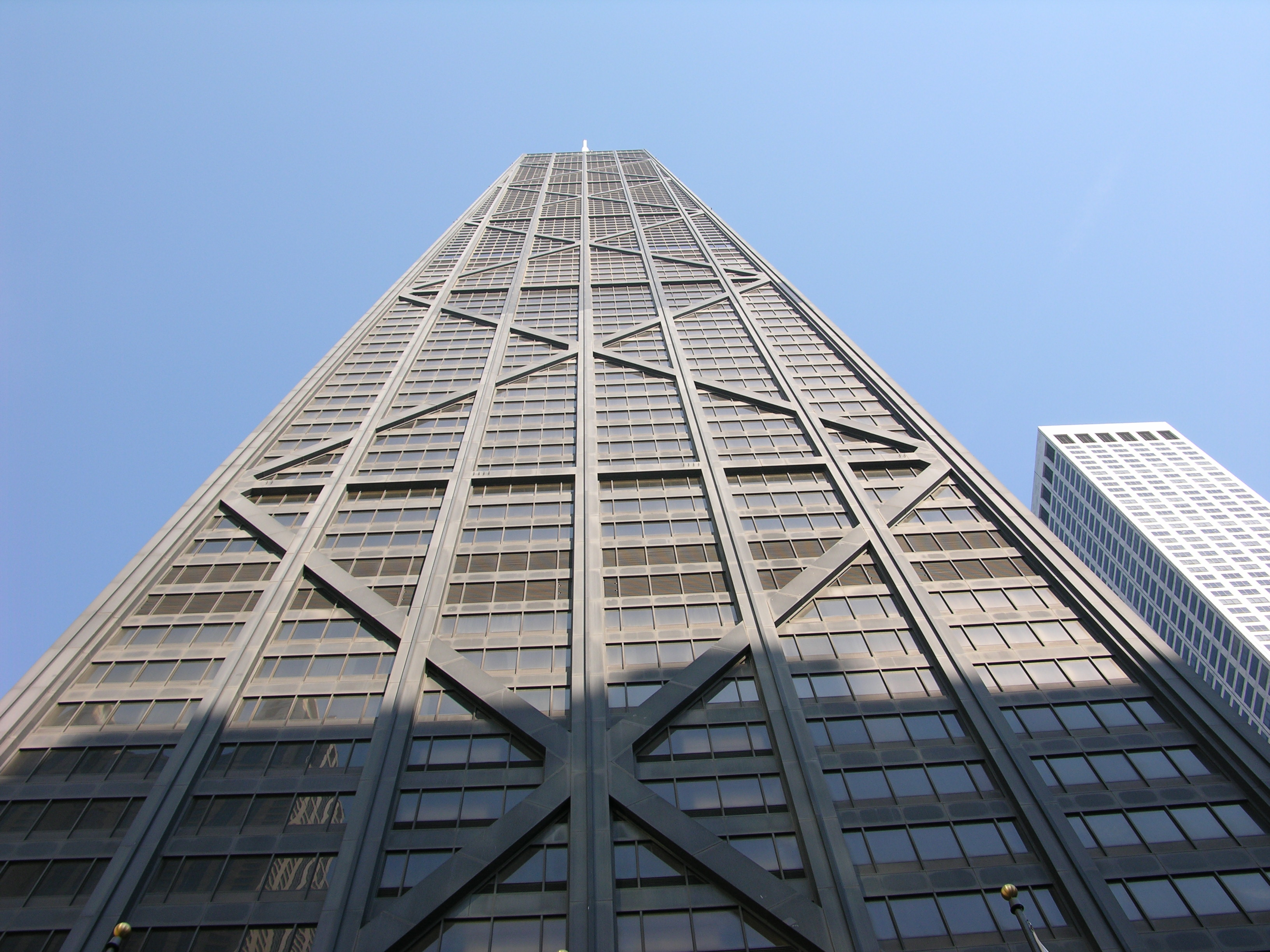
The John Hancock Tower has visible X-bracing on its exterior

X-bracing is a structural engineering practice where the lateral load on a building is reduced by transferring the load into the exterior columns.

X-bracing was used in the construction of the 1908 Singer Building, then the tallest building in the world.

Some skyscrapers by engineer Fazlur Khan, such as the 1969 John Hancock Center, have a distinctive X-bracing exterior, allowing for both higher performance from tall structures and the ability to open up the inside floorplan (and usable floor space) if the architect desires.
