= Focused impedance measurement =

- Purpose: quantifying the electrical resistance in tissues

Focused Impedance Measurement (FIM) is a recent technique for quantifying the electrical resistance in tissues of the human body with improved zone localization compared to conventional methods. This method was proposed and developed by Department of Biomedical Physics and Technology of University of Dhaka under the supervision of Prof. Khondkar Siddique-e-Rabbani; who first introduced the idea. FIM can be considered a bridge between Four Electrode Impedance Measurement (FEIM) and Electrical impedance Tomography (EIT), and provides a middle ground in terms of simplicity and accuracy.

Many biological parameters and processes can be detected and monitored through their effects on bioimpedance. Bioimpedance measurement can be performed with a few simple instruments and non-invasively.

Measurement of electrical impedance to obtain physiological or diagnostic information has been of interest to researchers for many years. However, the human body is geometrically and conductively uneven, with variation between individuals and phases of normal body activity, and bioimpedance results from many factors, including ion concentrations, cell geometry, extra-cellular fluids, intra-cellular fluids, and organ geometry. This makes accurate analysis of results from a small number of electrodes difficult and unreliable. Identifying zones with specific impedances can provide greater certainty regarding the factors behind the impedance.

Conventional Four Electrode or Tetra-polar Impedance Measurement (TPIM) is simple, but the zone of sensitivity is not well defined and may include organs other that those of interest, making interpretation difficult and unreliable. On the other hand, Electrical impedance tomography (EIT) offers reasonable resolution, but is complex and require many electrodes. By placing two FEIM systems perpendicular to each other over a common zone at the center and combining the results, it is possible to obtain enhanced sensitivity over this central zone. This is the basis of FIM, which may be useful for impedance measurements of large organs like stomach, heart, and lungs. Being much simpler in comparison to EIT, multifrequency systems can be simply built for FIM.

FIM may be useful in other fields where impedance measurements are performed, like geology.

== See also ==
- Impedance cardiography
