= Khondkar Siddique-e-Rabbani =

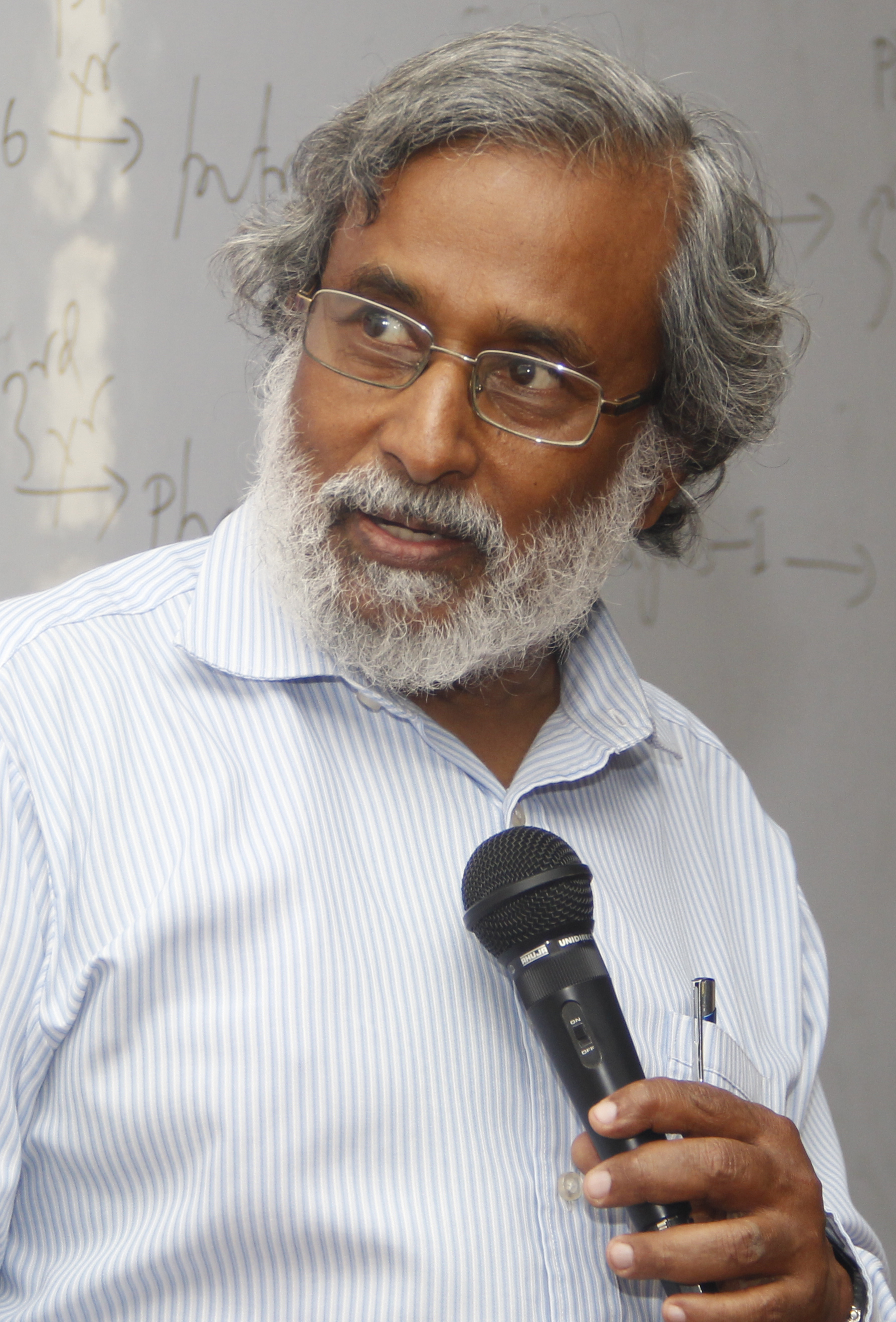
- Rabbani in 2016
- Born: 9 May 1950 (age 76)
- Education: University of Dhaka; Islamabad University; University of Southampton

Khondkar Siddique-e-Rabbani (Bengali: খন্দকার সিদ্দিক-ই-রাব্বানী; born 9 May 1950) is a Bangladeshi Biomedical physicist and notable for developing the Focused Impedance Measurement method. In 2008, he was awarded the Academy Gold Medal by Bangladesh Academy of Sciences for his contribution to physical sciences in Bangladesh. Rabbani is the founding chairperson of the Department of Biomedical Physics and Technology (BMPT) at the University of Dhaka.

== Education and career ==
Rabbani completed his bachelor's from University of Dhaka and master's from Islamabad University in 1970 and 1972 respectively. He then earned his Ph.D. from the University of Southampton in Microelectronics as a Commonwealth Scholar in 1978. He then joined as a faculty member of the Department of Physics at the University of Dhaka. In 2008, he became the first Chairperson of the post-graduate Department of Biomedical Physics and Technology at the University of Dhaka.

== Works ==
Rabbani has been working to improve the condition of economically deprived people of Bangladesh through innovating low cost and easily accessible technologies. He had three major innovations cited by Bangladesh Academy of Sciences as, "A simple and low cost method to destroy diarrhoeal germs in water using solar radiation; Surface water free of Arsenic that can be made drinkable; a localised electrical impedance technique named ‘Focused Impedance Method (FIM), having the potential to study, diagnose or characterize medical conditions including lung, stomach and vascular functions and some cancers; a nerve conduction measurement technique ‘Distribution of F-latency, (DFL), that can give inner profile of conduction velocity of motor nerve fibres in a nerve trunk, for which no clinically suitable method existed before".

== Awards ==
- Ibrahim Memorial Gold Medal Award
- UGC Award (2007)
- National Fellowship of the Asiatic Society of Bangladesh (1995)
- Third World Academy of Science (TWAS) - BAS Gold Medal Award for Physical Sciences, Junior group (1990)
