= Mubarak Ahmad Khan =

Bangladeshi scientist

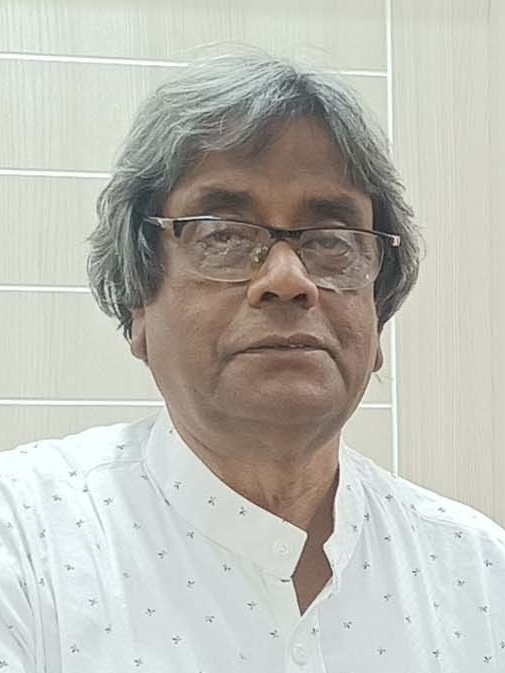
- Khan in August 2024
- Education: Jahangirnagar University
- Known for: Sonali Bag
- Awards: See full list
- Scientific career
- Fields: Environmental science; Material science; Polymer science; Nano-technology; Agriculture science; Biological sciences
- Workplaces: Bangladesh Atomic Energy Commission; Bangladesh Jute Mills Corporation
- Doctoral advisor: Lawrence Drzal; Georg Hinrichsen
- Website: www.mubarakahmadkhan.org

Mubarak Ahmad Khan is a Bangladeshi scientist and a researcher in jute's commercial uses and possibilities. According to the science-based research database, Scopus, he is considered to be the leading scientist in the study of jute worldwide. He is currently serving as the Scientific Advisor of Bangladesh Jute Mills corporation (BJMC). Among his inventions are the Sonali Bag, Jutin, and helmets and tiles made from jute.

Khan was conferred Independence Award, the highest civilian award, by the government of Bangladesh in 2024.

== Early life and education ==
Khan completed his bachelor's degree and master's degrees at Jahangirnagar University. In 1991, he completed a Ph.D. degree in polymer and radioactive chemistry and later earned post doctoral degrees from Germany, Japan and the United States.

== Career ==
In 1984, Khan started his professional career as a Scientific Officer in Radiation and Polymer Chemistry Laboratory, Bangladesh Atomic Energy Commission. During 1990–2000, he was a Senior Scientific Officer and from 2001 to 2009, he was Principal Scientific Officer and Group Leader in that laboratory. From 2009 to 2015, he was the Chief Scientific Officer and Director of Institute of Radiation and Polymer Technology, Bangladesh Atomic Energy Commission. From 2015 to 2017, he was served as a Director General in Bangladesh Atomic Energy Commission. Starting in 2017, he is acting as a Scientific Advisor of Bangladesh Jute Mill's Corporation and he has served as a consultant in many private companies in Bangladesh.

In 1990, Khan was IAEA fellow in University of New South Wales, Australia. In 1995 and 2014, he was a DAAD fellow in Technische Universität Berlin, Germany and Jacobs University (now Constructor University) in Bremen, Germany. In 1997, he worked in "Matsumae International Foundation (MIF)", Japan. In 2000, he was a visiting professor at Michigan State University, USA. In 2003, 2005, 2007, 2010 and 2014, he was Alexander von Humboldt fellow (AvH) in Fraunhofer Institute for Applied Polymer Research and University of Kassel, Germany. In 2017, he worked for the Japan Society for the Promotion of Science (JSPS), Kumamoto University, Japan.

Khan has been a faculty member at institutions like Mirzapur College (1982–1984), Shahjalal University of Science and Technology (1991–2002), Mawlana Bhashani Science and Technology University (2010–2016) and from 2012 to present is an adjunct professor of the University of Dhaka. He is a visiting professor of Daffodil International University and Islamic University of Technology, Bangladesh. He has supervised more than 300 M.Sc. students, 8 M. Ph. students and 20 Ph.D. students.

== Works ==
Khan works on environmental science, material science, health care, agriculture and biological science. He is working on sustainable material and also working on nano-technology. He invented biodegradable polybag (Sonali Bag) from jute fiber to remove plastic pollution. He worked on different types of composite materials, invented Jute Reinforcement Corrugated Sheet (Commercial name: Jutin) by mixing jute with polymer. He invented an advanced wound dressing material from cow bone, biodegradable PPE from jute with chitosan, biodegradable sanitary napkin from jute based superabsorbent, Natural Dye Sensitized Solar Cell. He has invented natural plant growth promoter from prawn shell, liquate biofertilizer from textile effluent, etc. In 2016 he created non-harmful proteins as an alternative to harmful formalin for human body. He also invented numerous essential things with jute.

=== Biodegradable polybag (Sonali Bag) ===
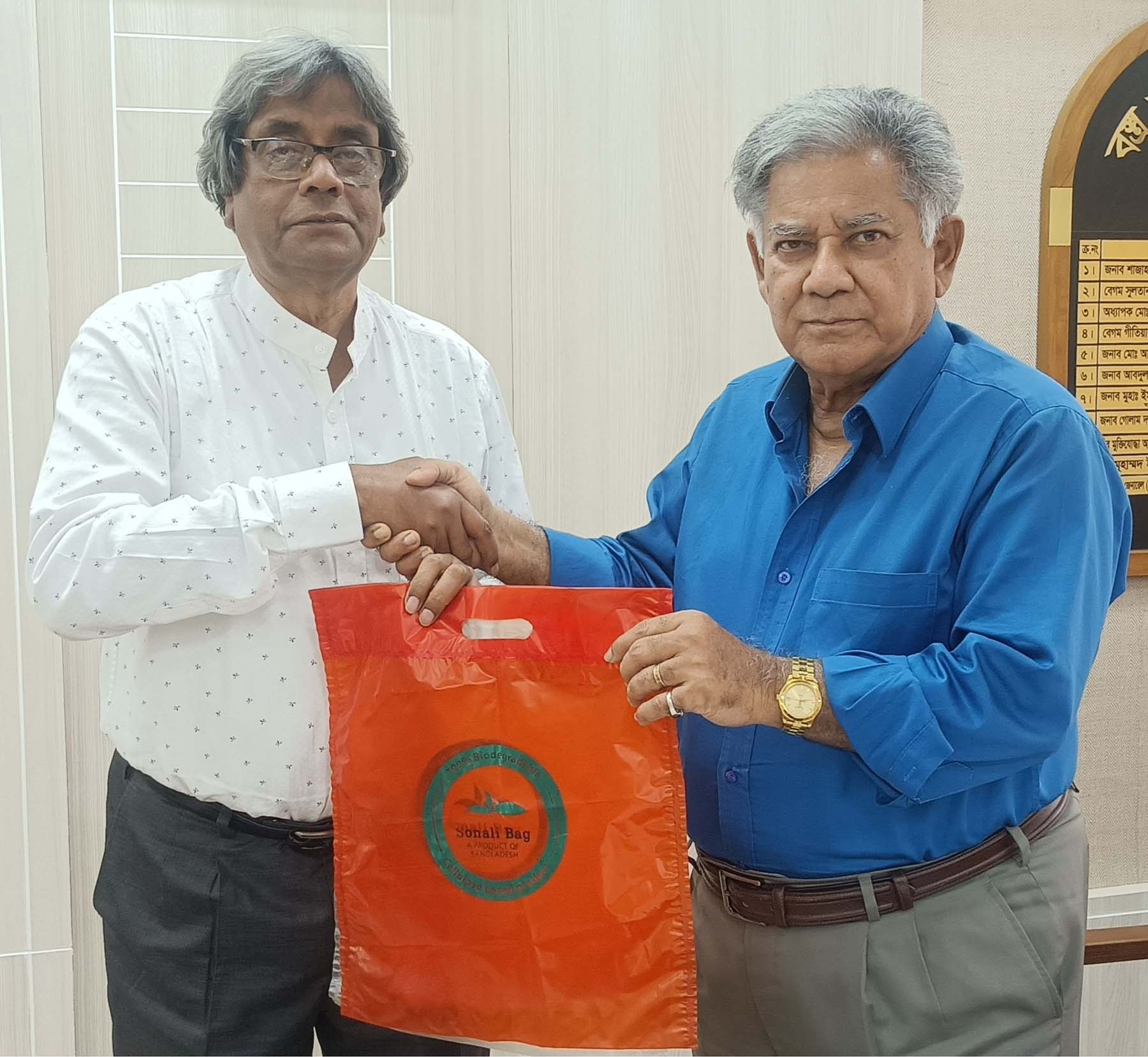
Khan presenting the Sonali bag to M. Sakhawat Hossain, former Advisor for Jute and Textiles of the interim government of Bangladesh.

The Sonali Bag is a cellulose-based biodegradable bioplastic alternative to plastic bags, particularly polythene bags. The cellulose used in Sonali Bags is extracted from jute, a major vegetable fiber crop grown across the globe. "Sonali Bag" was named by Bangladesh Prime Minister Sheikh Hasina in 2017. The Sonali Bag (biopolymer) is made of natural ingredients like jute based cellulose, binder (a natural polymer), and vegetable color. The preparation method and instrument of the biopolymer is different then that traditional plastic.

==== Positive effect on environment of Sonali Bag ====
Polyolefins like polyethylene and polypropylene are hydrocarbon hydrophobic polymers, resistant to peroxidation, biodegradation, highly resistant to hydrolysis, which is their main attribute in packaging, and not biodegradable. Nowadays their use has to be restricted and banned because they are not totally recyclable, biodegradable, compostable and eco-friendly so they pose serious ecological problems, toxic substance, contaminated foods and biological substance and serious health hazard and diseases. The main aim of biodegradable, compostable, recyclable and environmental friendly packaging material is to imitate the life cycle of biomass, which includes conservation of fossil resources, water, and CO_{2} production. The speed of biodegradation depends on temperature (50 to 70C), humidity, number and type of microbes. Biodegradable packaging materials are converted into biomass, water, and CO_{2} in about 180 day. On the other hand, Sonali Bag is made from natural resources i.e., jute cellulose. It is designed to degrade upon disposal by the action of living organisms. So it is 100% biodegradable, compostable, recyclable and eco-friendly, it decomposes in the soil within 3–4 months and increases the soil fertility. This bag produces biomass e.g., CO_{2}, H_{2}O etc. when it is buried as landfill. The production process is also suitable for the environment because all kinds of chemicals are nontoxic which are used during the production process and there is no smoke or fume produce during processing. It becomes ash when it burn, produces only carbon molecules. The roots of plants can easily penetrate into the bag during landfill, and there is no harmful effect on seed germination. The biodegradable packaging materials of Sonali Bag start to dissolve in water after 5 hours and are formed into biological foods. Cellulose is renewable like carbon dioxide, water and sunshine. It is biodegradable; eco- friendly and cheap. It is very easy to modify it chemically and physically. The source of raw materials of cellulose is abundant in Bangladesh. So it is unnecessary to rely on petroleum to prepare polymer. People may raise this polymer by planting trees on earth, so the environmental problems will be no longer as severe as today.

=== Jute reinforced polymer corrugated sheet (Jutin) ===
Jutin is a low cost and durable housing material. Jutin is a lightweight, ultra-strong, corrugated, and sustainable jute reinforced polymer composite. It is rustproof, soundproof, and saline water-resistance. Its low thermal conductivity provides more comfort in both summer and winter. Now Jutin is being manufactured in Khan's laboratory manually but a pilot-scale production facility is under construction collaborating with a private entrepreneur.

== Awards and honors ==
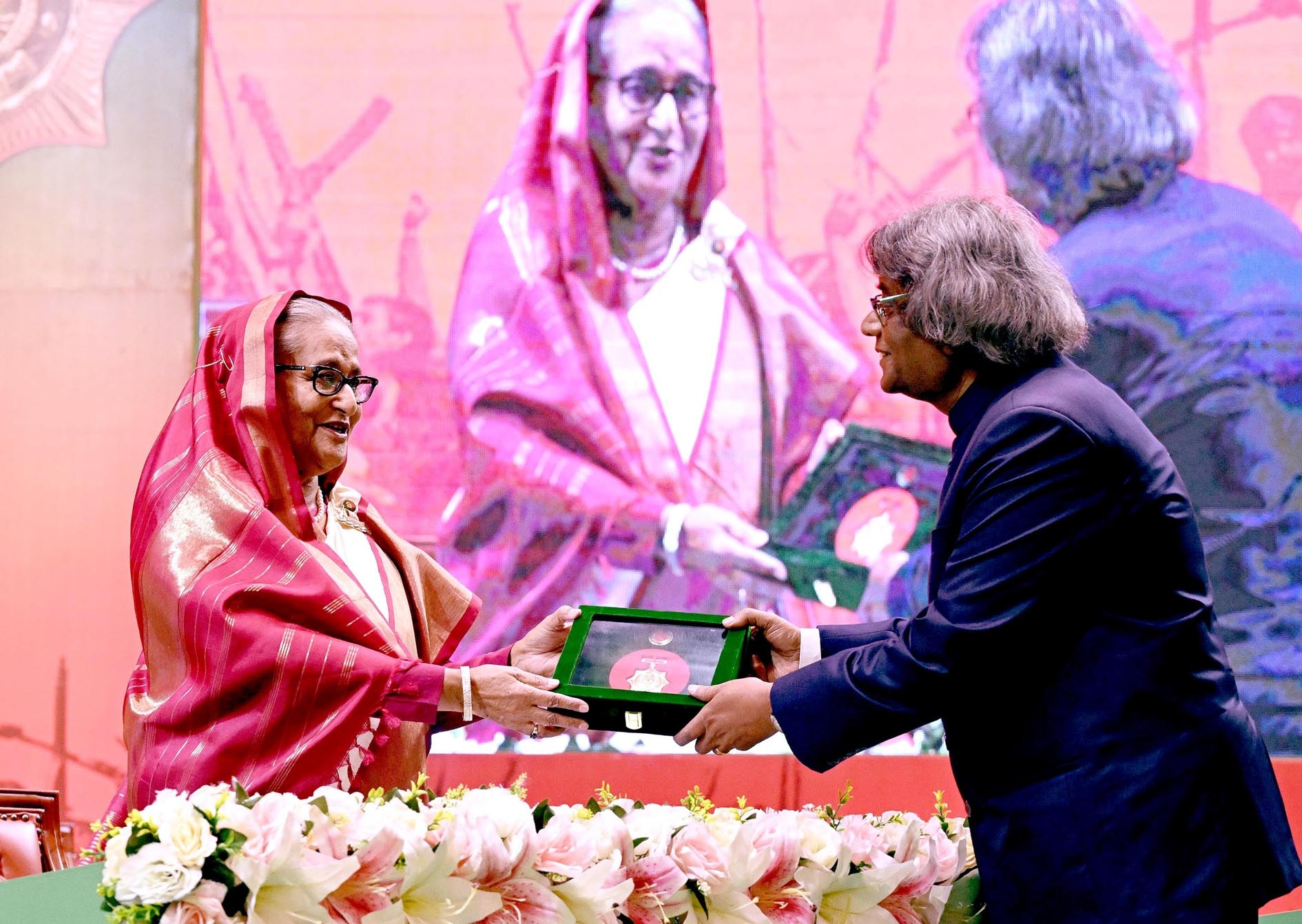
Khan receives Independence Award from former Prime Minister Sheikh Hasina in 2024.

- Gold Medal by Bangladesh Academy of Sciences (2010)
- National Jute Award (2016)
- Federation of Asian Chemical Society Award (2017)
- National Environment Awards (2019)
- MIT Solve Health Security & Pandemic Awards (2020)
- Independence Award (2024)
- Asian Scientist 100 by Asian Scientist (2025)
