= Plaza on DeWitt =

Condominium building in Chicago, Illinois

The Plaza on DeWitt
- Interactive map of the The Plaza on DeWitt area

General information
- Status: Completed
- Type: Residential
- Location: 260 E. Chestnut Street; Chicago, Illinois
- Coordinates: 41°53′55″N 87°37′11″W
- Construction started: 1963
- Completed: 1966

Height
- Roof: 395 ft (120 m)

Technical details
- Floor count: 43

Design and construction
- Architect: Fazlur Khan (Skidmore, Owings & Merrill)

The Plaza on DeWitt is a 407 unit condominium property at 260 E. Chestnut Street in the Streeterville neighborhood of Chicago.

It was the first building in the world to implement the tubular construction, later used for the World Trade Center. Originally called the DeWitt-Chestnut Apartment Building, it was designed by Bangladeshi-American engineer Fazlur Rahman Khan while he was working for Skidmore, Owings & Merrill. It was completed in 1966 as a residential apartment building, and was converted to condominiums in 1975. The 43-story tower accommodates 407 residences and is clad in travertine marble. Formerly, a ground floor French bistro, Le Petit Paris, served traditional French cuisine.

== Incidents ==
In 2002, a fire on the 14th floor killed one and injured 11 people.

On December 10, 2009 a fire on the 36th floor killed one person and injured 12 people. About one third of the Chicago Fire Department's equipment and about 300 firefighters responded to the 2009 fire.
