= Axis Apartments =

Apartment building in Chicago, Illinois

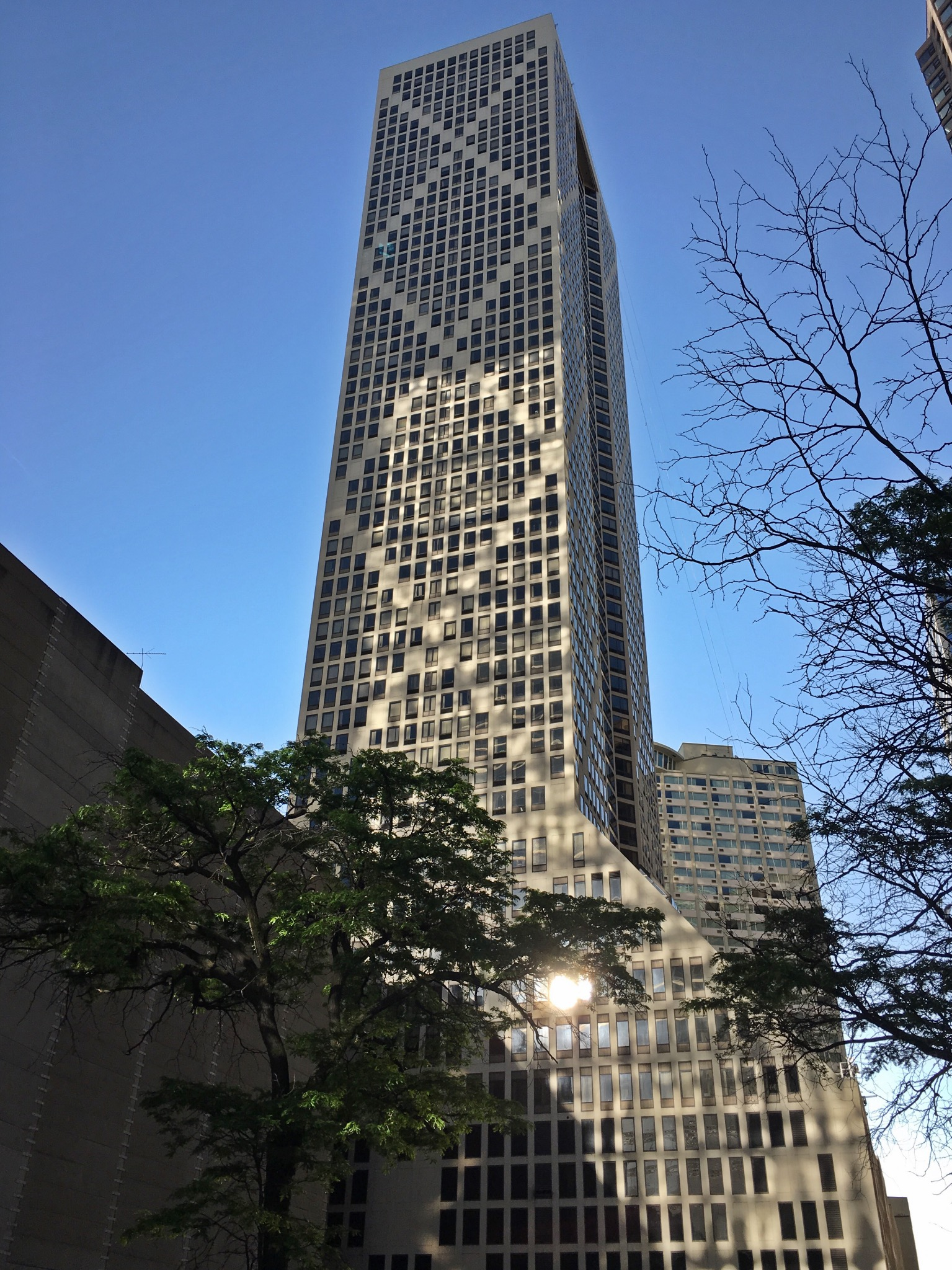

- Location within Illinois

General information
- Type: Residential
- Location: 441 East Erie Street, Chicago, Illinois
- Coordinates: 41.8939°N 87.6165°W
- Completed: 1986

Height
- Roof: 570 ft (170 m)

Technical details
- Floor count: 60

Design and construction
- Architects: Fazlur Rahman Khan (Skidmore, Owings & Merrill)

Axis Apartments is a sixty-story high rise apartment tower in downtown Chicago, Illinois, United States.

Designed by Skidmore, Owings & Merrill, it was completed in 1986 as Onterie Center. The name was a conflation of "Ontario" and "Erie", the streets at its two entrances. The building consists of two towers: a 60-story Main Tower and an 11-story Auxiliary Tower. At 570 feet (174 m), the Main Tower claims its place among the 50 tallest buildings in Chicago.

The building is considered the "final work" by respected Bangladeshi-American structural engineer and designer Fazlur Rahman Khan. Completed after his death, the diagonal brace structure is dedicated to Khan, and serves as an architectural nod to his John Hancock Center. The X formations on the exterior are concrete infill panels which act together to form a truss tube. There are no steel beams behind them. A similar structured building, 780 Third Avenue in New York City, was completed in 1983. Onterie Center is the first concrete high-rise in the world to use diagonal shearwalls at the building perimeter. This type of design uses fewer columns and allows for a distinct unit layout. In 1986 this building won the Best Structure Award from the Structural Engineers Association of Illinois.

In addition to its 594 apartments, Onterie Center also includes more than 140,000 square feet (13,000 m^{2}) of office space (13,000 square meter), nearly 16,000 square feet (1,500 square meter) of ground-floor retail space, an 11,750-square-foot (1,100 square meter) health club facility with indoor swimming pool, and a 363-space, above-grade parking garage.

In 2023, the Chicago City Council approved the conversion of the structure's vacant office portion, on floors 6-10, into a 101-room hotel.

== See also ==
- List of tallest buildings in Chicago
