= Sonali Bag =

Biodegradable polymer bag made from jute

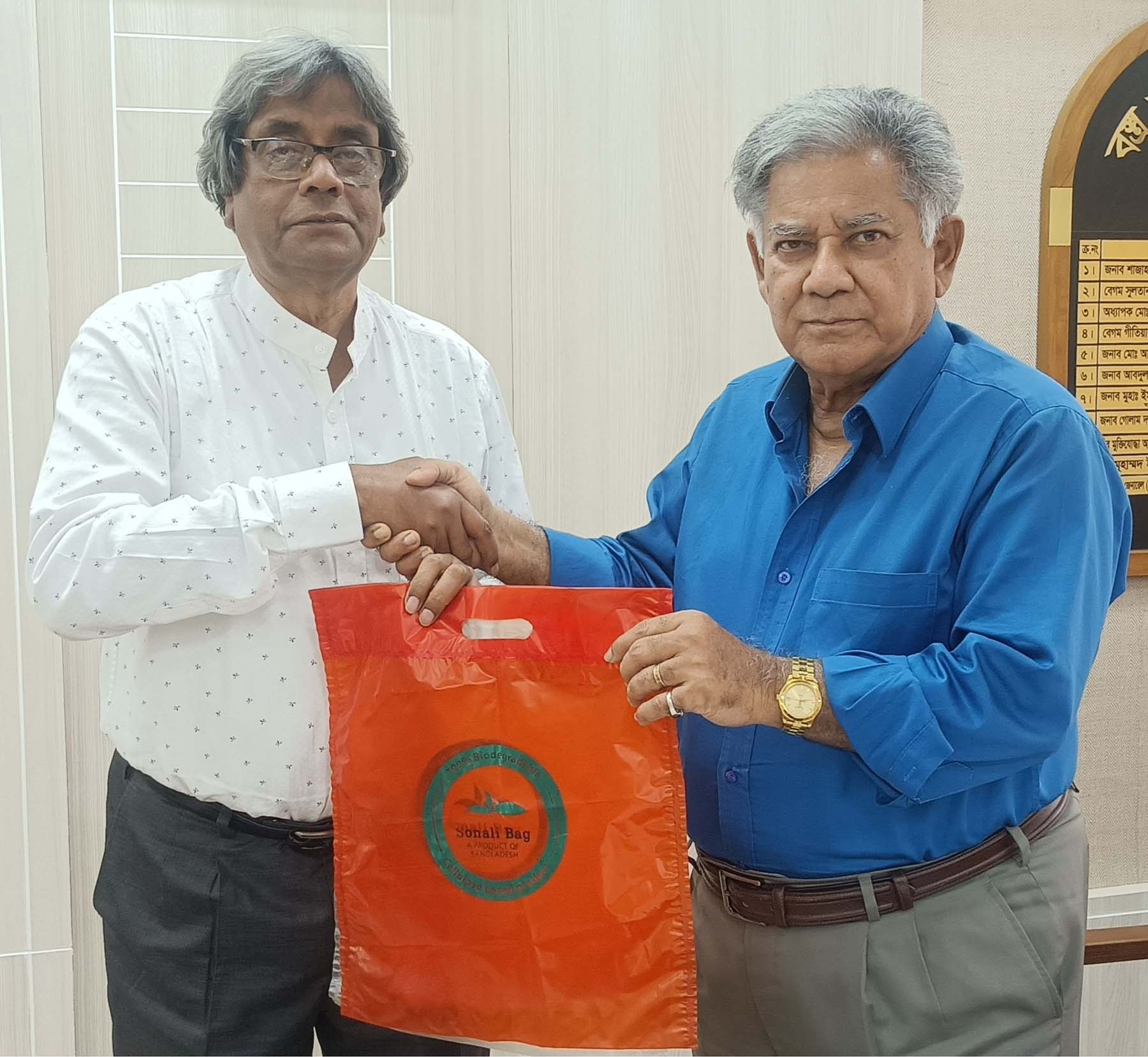
Mubarak Ahmad Khan presenting the Sonali bag to M. Sakhawat Hossain, Advisor for Jute and Textiles of the interim government of Bangladesh.

The Sonali Bag, also known as the Golden Bag, Jute Polymer, or Eco-friendly Poly Bag (in Bengali: সোনালী ব্যাগ), is a bag made of a biodegradable bioplastic. It was created in Bangladesh as a sustainable alternative to traditional plastic bags by scientist Mubarak Ahmad Khan. The primary ingredient in the Sonali Bag is cellulose, derived from jute, a globally cultivated vegetable fiber crop.

== History ==
In 2002, Bangladesh imposed a ban on polythene bags due to rising environmental concerns. This legislative move spurred research into natural fiber composite (NFC) materials as potential replacements for polythene. Mubarak Ahmad Khan, a scientist at the Bangladesh Atomic Energy Commission, worked with researchers from Bangladesh over several decades to create a new type of natural fiber composite (NFC) material made from jute. In 2018, the Bangladesh Jute Mills Corporation (BJMC) started the commercial production of Sonali Bag using a jute-based NFC developed by Mubarak Ahmad Khan. The product was named "Sonali Bag" (sonali is Bengali for "golden") by Prime Minister Sheikh Hasina. This name reflects a nickname used for jute in Bangladesh, 'the golden fiber'.

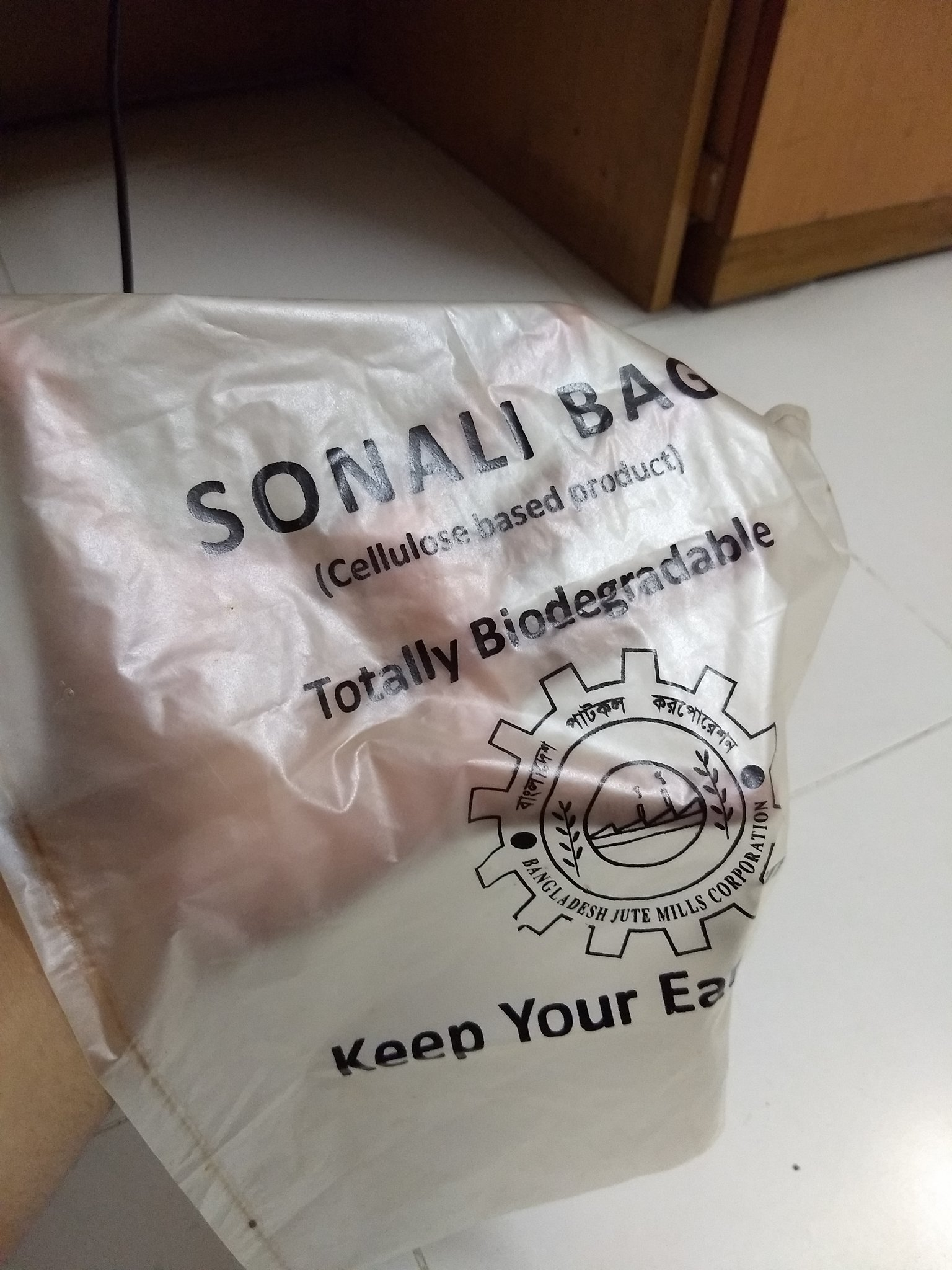
Bangladeshi scientist Mubarak Ahmad Khan invented Sonali Bag, a biodegradable bioplastic bag and an alternative to conventional plastic bags.
