= International Association for Life Cycle Civil Engineering =

IALCCE
- Founded: October 2006
- Type: Professional Organization
- Purpose: Life-Cycle Civil Engineering
- Region served: Worldwide
- Method: Congresses, conferences, symposia, workshops, seminars, and short courses on the related topics
- Members: 900+ (October 2024)
- Key people: Dan M. Frangopol (Founding President), Fabio Biondini (Secretary General)
- Website: ialcce.org

The International Association for Life-Cycle Civil Engineering (IALCCE) is an international organization founded in October 2006. Its declared mission is "to be the premier international organization for the advancement of the state-of-the-art in the field of life-cycle civil engineering".

== Activities ==
The activities of the IALCCE cover all aspects of life-cycle assessment, design, maintenance, rehabilitation and monitoring of civil engineering systems. Eight International Symposia have been organized since the foundation of IALCCE. The inaugural IALCCE Symposium was held in Varenna, Lake Como, Italy, in June 2008, under the auspices of Politecnico di Milano. Following IALCCE 2008, a series of Symposia have been organized in Taipei, Taiwan (IALCCE 2010), Vienna, Austria (IALCCE 2012), Tokyo, Japan (IALCCE 2014), Delft, Netherlands (IALCCE 2016), Ghent, Belgium (IALCCE 2018), Shanghai, China (IALCCE 2020), and Milan, Italy (IALCCE 2023). These events have been very successful, both technically and academically, and IALCCE Symposia have become established events in the field of Life-Cycle Civil Engineering and related topics. With IALCCE 2023 back to Italy, the 15th Anniversary of IALCCE Symposia has been celebrated where these events were initiated. The Ninth International Symposium on Life‑Cycle Civil Engineering (IALCCE 2025) will be held in Melbourne, Australia, on July 15-19, 2025.

== Publications ==
The outcomes of the IALCCE International Symposia are collected in a Book Series "Life-Cycle of Civil Engineering Systems", published by CRC Press, Taylor & Francis Group. The proceedings published in this Series will serve as a valuable reference to all concerned with life-cycle performance of civil engineering systems.

The extended version of selected papers included in the proceedings of IALCCE Symposia have been considered for publication in special issues of Structure and Infrastructure Engineering, an international peer-reviewed journal included in the ISI Science Citation Index and endorsed by IALCCE. Seven special issues have been published, with 80+ journal papers (about 5% of the papers presented at IALCCE Symposia) and 1000+ pages. A special issue dedicated to IALCCE 2023 is currently in progress.
