= Light table =

Viewing device illuminated from below

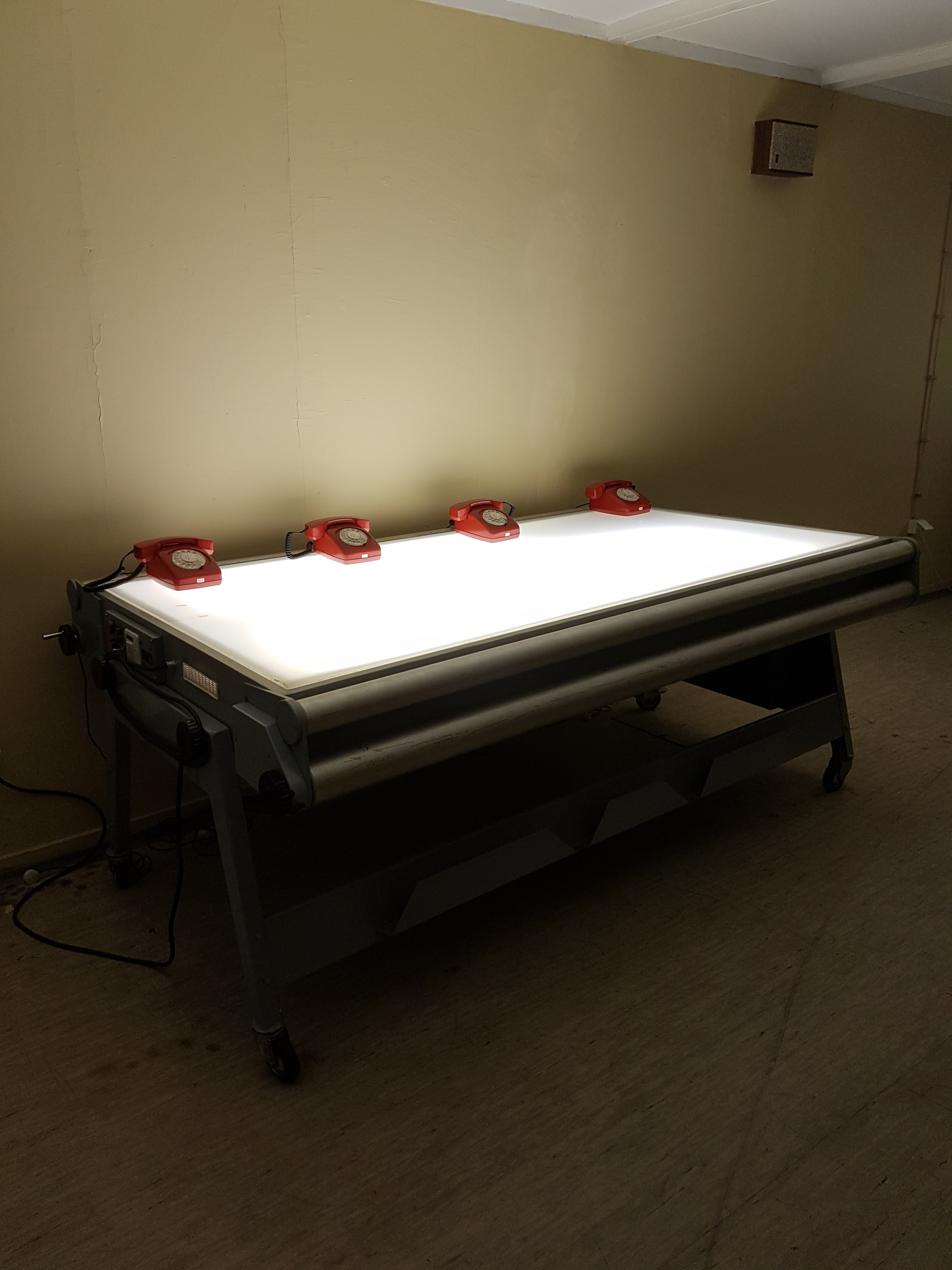
Light table at Tito's bunker

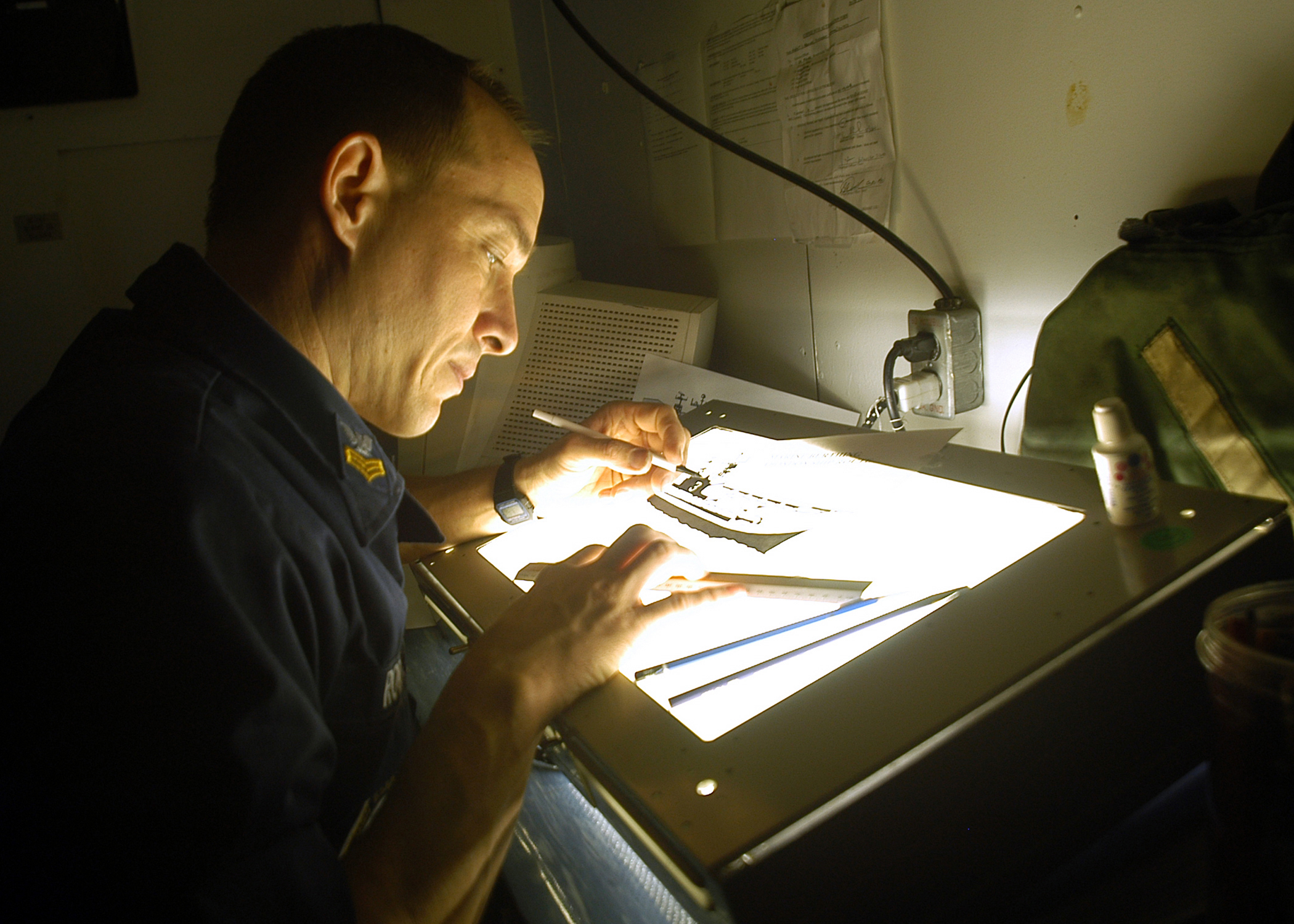
Draftsman using light table

A light table is a viewing device that is used to review photographic film or artwork placed on top of it by providing an even illumination of the subject from underneath via a diffusing translucent cover placed over a fluorescent light.

Some light tables are simply large light boxes placed atop some support, while others are large and complicated affairs, with stereoscopes integrated as a self-supporting unit, for example, those used by Tomcat TARPS squadrons for interpreting aerial photographs.

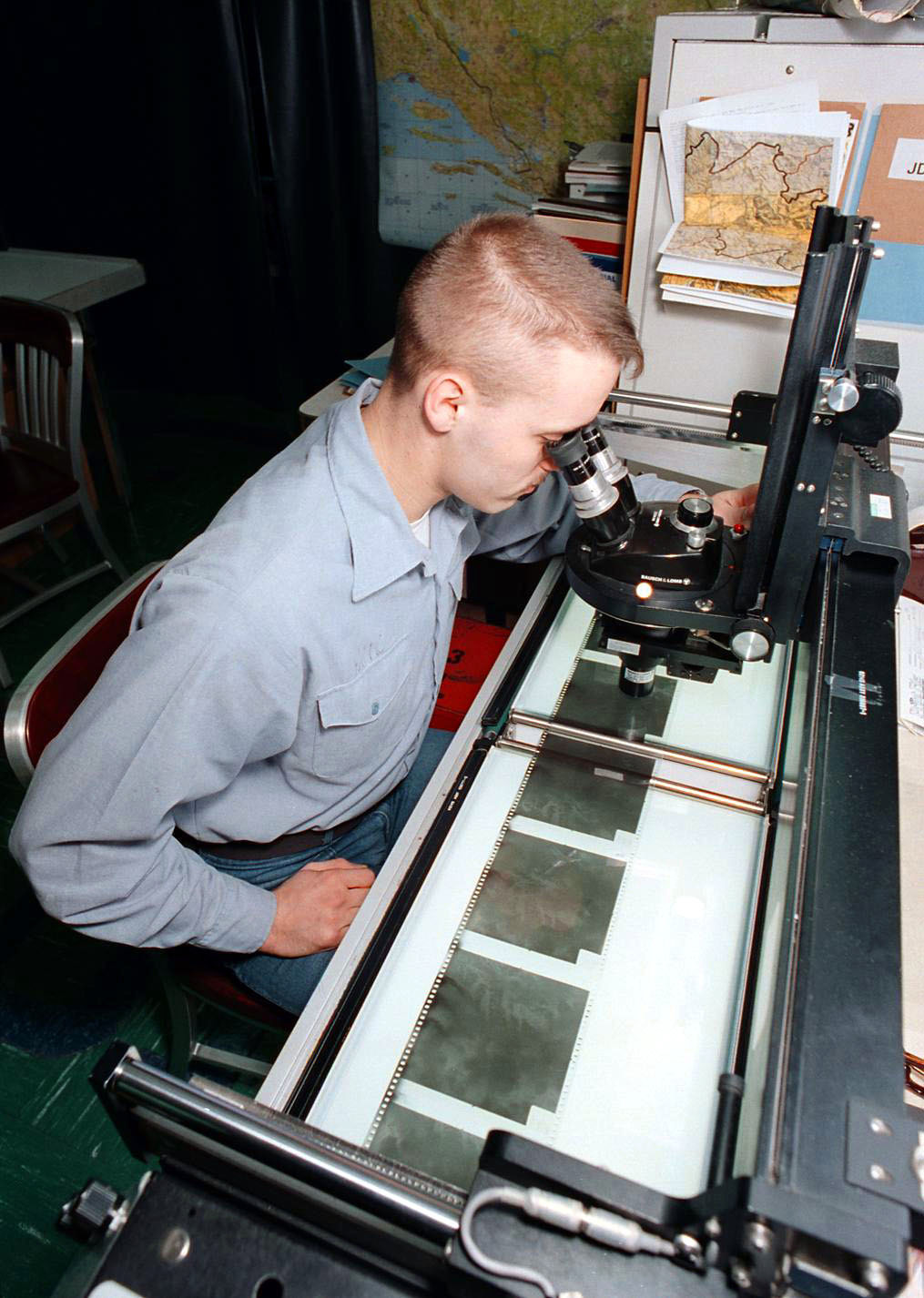
TARPS Intelligence Specialist uses a light table to analyze film from KS-87 camera.

Light tables are mainly used in the graphics trade to trace designs, especially when making comics or animated cartoons. Another use case for light tables is to review film negatives, photoliths, or any kind of artwork which can be placed on top of it.

Light boxes also find uses in education, architecture, interior design, fashion, and in hospitals for viewing radiographs (X-rays, MRI, etc.).

== See also ==
- Mimeoscope
- Exposure unit
