= Mimeoscope =

In 1914–16, the A.B. Dick Company patented the mimeoscope. A mimeoscope, which is basically a light table, had an electrically illuminated glass top on which the operator traced drawings onto mimeograph stencils. The stencil took the place of tracing paper. The electric light was needed because the stencils were heavier and less transparent than tracing paper.

Mimeoscopes were used for a lot of illustrations and in promotional work as well. Designs, maps, and plans could be easily drawn and copied for quick production and distribution. Customers could add these visuals to their instructions or announcements. Those who did not have time to read the entire document would still be able to look at it and quickly know what it was about.
