= Phototypesetting =

Photographical analog method for text composition

Phototypesetting is a method of setting type which uses photography to make columns of type on a scroll of photographic paper. It has been made obsolete by the popularity of the personal computer and desktop publishing which gave rise to digital typesetting.

The first phototypesetters quickly project light through a film negative of an individual character in a font, then through a lens that magnifies or reduces the size of the character onto photographic paper or film, which is collected on a spool in a light-proof canister. The paper or film is then fed into a processor, a machine that pulls the paper or film strip through two or three baths of chemicals, from which it emerges with visible text, ready for paste-up or film make-up. Later phototypesetting machines used other methods, such as displaying a digitised character on a CRT screen. The results of this process are then transferred onto printing plates which are used in offset printing.

Phototypesetting offered numerous advantages over the metal type used in letterpress printing, including the lack of need to keep heavy metal type and matrices in stock, the ability to use a much wider range of fonts and graphics and to print them at any desired size, and faster page layout setting.

== History ==
=== Background ===
Phototypesetting machines project characters onto film for offset printing. Prior to the advent of phototypesetting, mass-market typesetting typically employed hot metal typesetting – an improvement introduced in the late 19th century to the letterpress printing technique that offered greatly improved typesetting speed and efficiency compared to manual typesetting (where every sort had to be set by hand). The major advancement presented by phototypesetting over hot metal typesetting was the elimination of the metal type altogether, which was not needed by the offset printing process. This cold-type technology could also be used in office environments where hot-metal machines (the Linotype, Intertype or Monotype) could not. The use of phototypesetting grew rapidly in the 1960s when software was developed to convert marked-up copy, usually typed on paper tape, to the codes that controlled the phototypesetters.

=== 1950s and 60s ===
==== Initial phototypesetting machines ====
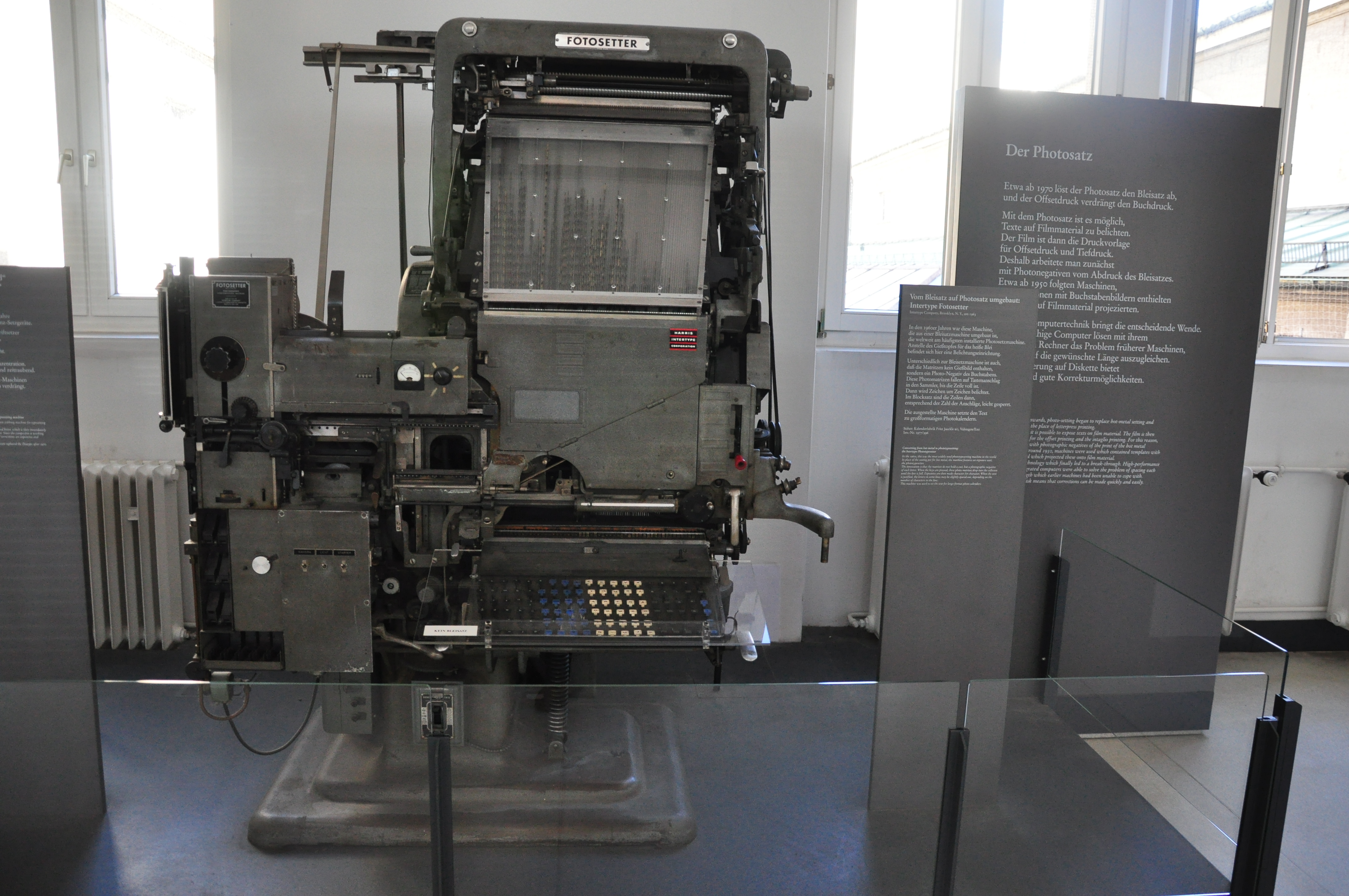
An Intertype Fotosetter, one of the most popular "first-generation" mass-market phototypesetting machines. The system is heavily based on hot metal typesetting technology, with the metal casting machinery replaced with photographic film, a light system and glass pictures of characters.

In 1949, the Photon Corporation in Cambridge, Massachusetts, developed equipment based on the Lumitype of Rene Higonnet and Louis Moyroud. The Lumitype-Photon was first used to set a complete published book in 1953, and for newspaper work in 1954. Mergenthaler produced the Linofilm using a different design, and Monotype produced Monophoto. Other companies followed with products that included Alphatype and Varityper.

To provide much greater speeds, the Photon Corporation produced the ZIP 200 machine for the MEDLARS project of the National Library of Medicine and Mergenthaler produced the Linotron. The ZIP 200 could produce text at 600 characters per second using high-speed flashes behind plates with images of the characters to be printed. Each character had a separate xenon flash constantly ready to fire. A separate system of optics positioned the image on the page.

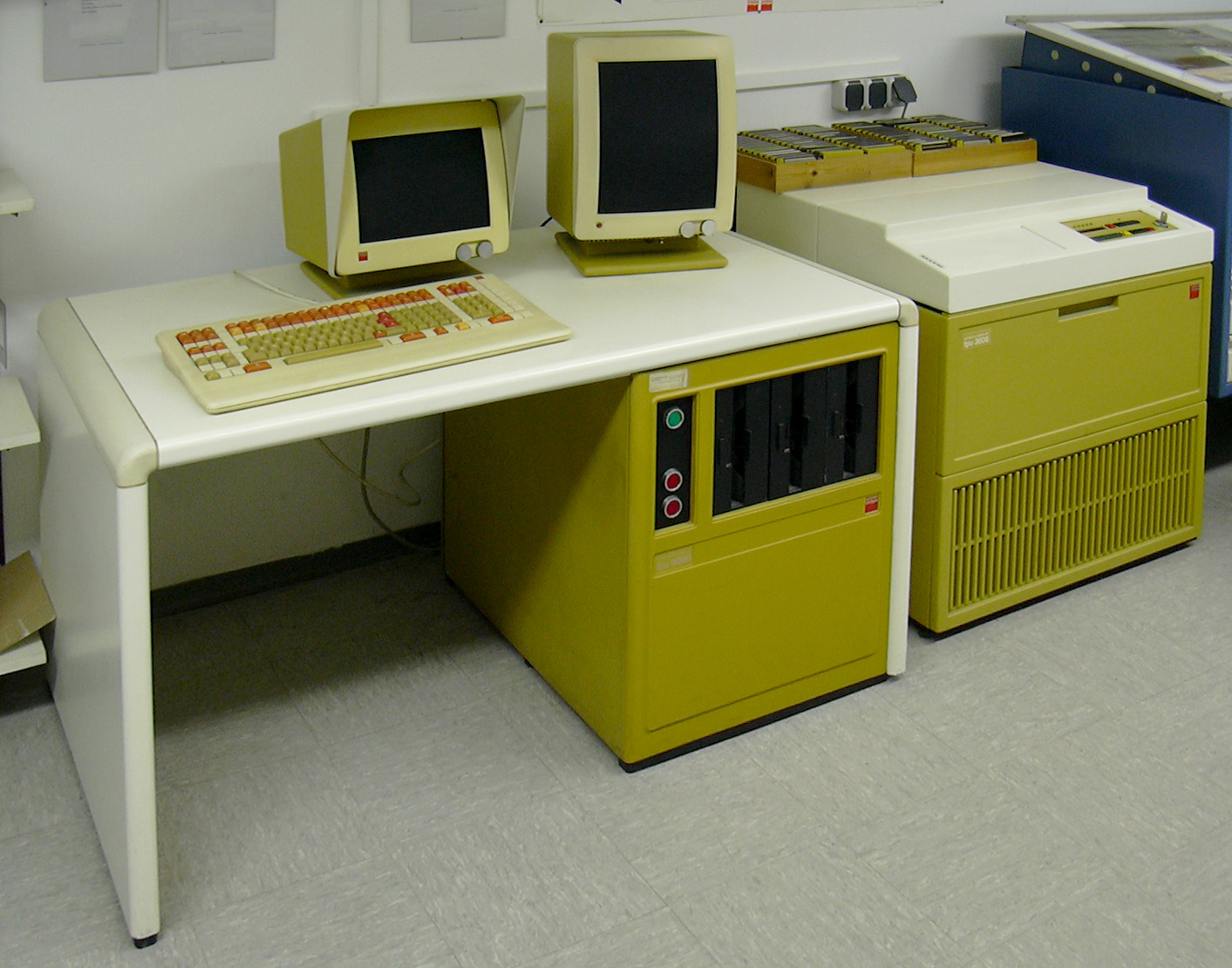
100 photosetting units tps 6300 and tpu 6308

==== Use of CRT screens for phototypesetting ====
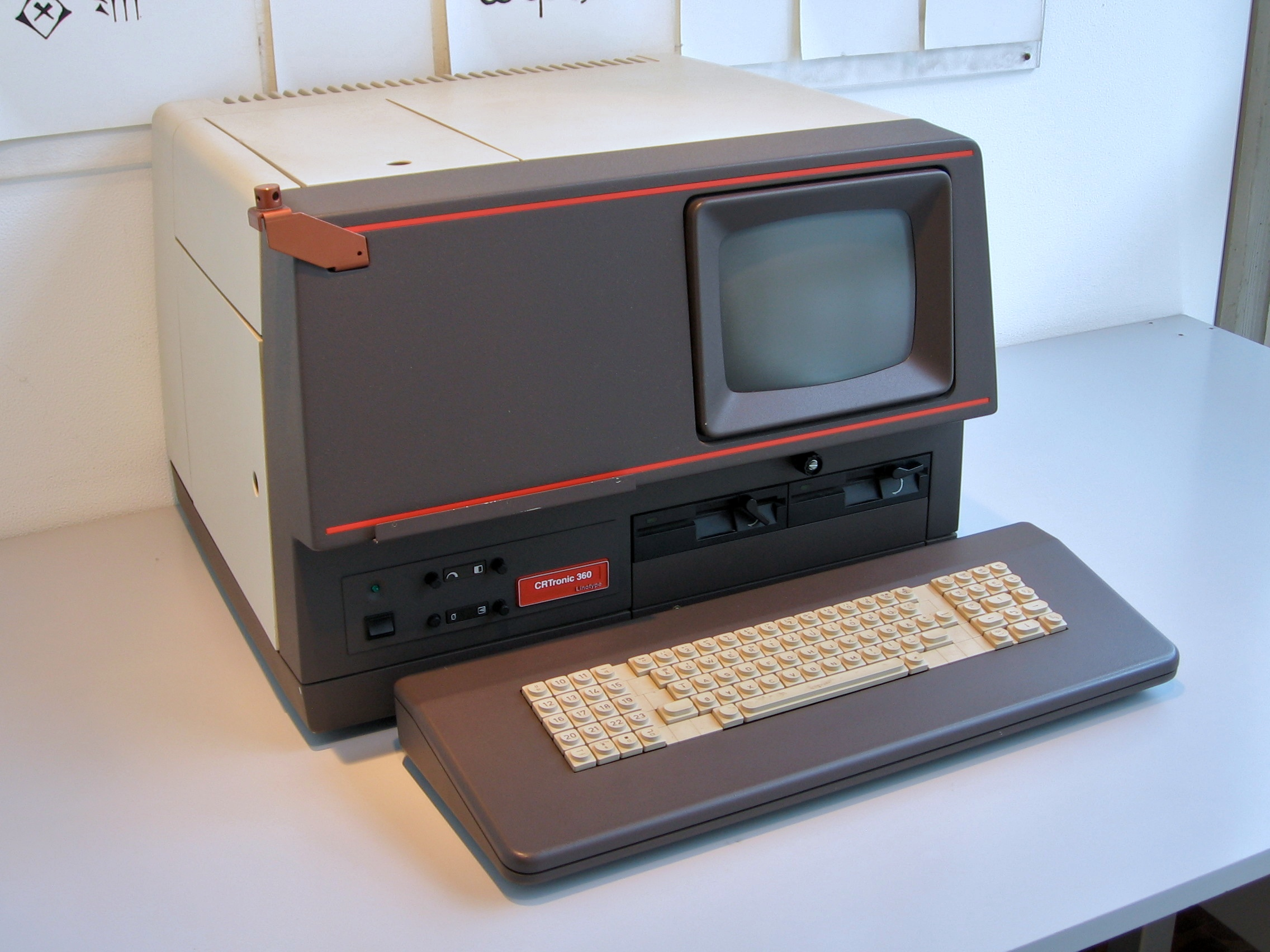
Linotype CRTronic 360

An enormous advance was made by the mid-1960s with the development of equipment that projects the characters from CRT screens. Early CRT phototypesetters, such as Linotype's Linotron 1010 from 1966, used the same type of film negative for the font source as traditional optical phototypesetters did, but by instead scanning the font negative via a flying spot scanner array to a video signal, which was then displayed on the CRT to be exposed to the photographic paper or film. Later CRT phototypesetters used high-resolution digitized font data stored in a frame buffer which was used to render the font characters directly to the CRT.

Alphanumeric Corporation (later Autologic) produced the APS series. Rudolf Hell developed the Digiset machine in Germany. The RCA Graphic Systems Division manufactured this in the U.S. as the Videocomp, later marketed by Information International Inc. Software for operator-controlled hyphenation was a major component of digital typesetting. Early work on this topic produced paper tape to control hot-metal machines. C. J. Duncan, at the University of Durham in England, was a pioneer. The earliest applications of computer-controlled phototypesetting machines produced the output of the Russian translation programs of Gilbert King at the IBM Research Laboratories, and built-up mathematical formulas and other material in the Cooperative Computing Laboratory of Michael Barnett at MIT.

There are extensive accounts of the early applications, the equipment and the PAGE algorithmic typesetting language for the Videocomp, that introduced elaborate formatting

In Europe, the company of Berthold had no experience in developing hot-metal typesetting equipment, but being one of the largest German type foundries, they applied themselves to the transference. Berthold successfully developed its Diatype (1960), Diatronic (1967), and ADS (1977) machines, which led the European high-end typesetting market for decades.

=== 1970s ===
==== Expansion of technology to small users ====
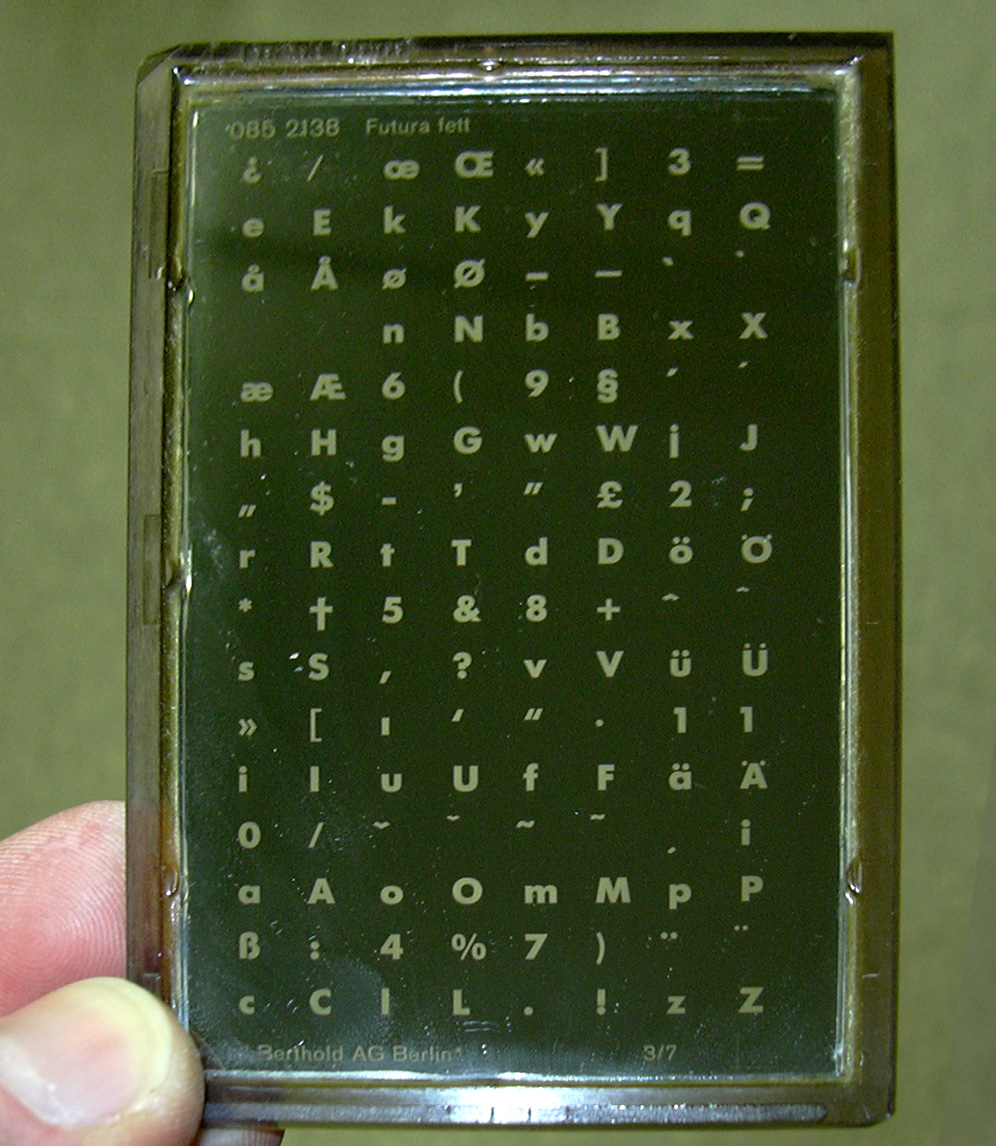
A Berthold Diatronic master plate, showing Futura

It was in Chicago in June 1968, with the wind blowing from the stockyards. People saw the output of the system.

"That's crap!" they cried.

"It costs only $8000."

"Say, that's not bad crap!"

— Typographers' reaction to the first Compugraphic phototypesetting equipment, as recounted by Jerry Pournelle

Compugraphic produced phototypesetting machines in the 1970s that made it economically feasible for small publications to set their own type with professional quality. One model, the Compugraphic Compuwriter, uses a filmstrip wrapped around a drum that rotates at several hundred revolutions per minute. The filmstrip contains two fonts (a Roman and a bold or a Roman and an Italic) in one point size. To get different-sized fonts, the typesetter loads a different font strip or uses a 2x magnifying lens built into the machine, which doubles the size of font. The CompuWriter II automated the lens switch and let the operator use multiple settings. Other manufacturers of photo compositing machines include Alphatype, Varityper, Mergenthaler, Autologic, Berthold, Dymo, Harris (formerly Linotype's competitor "Intertype"), Monotype, Star/Photon, Graphic Systems Inc., Hell AG, MGD Graphic Systems, and American Type Founders.

Released in 1975, the Compuwriter IV holds two filmstrips, each holding four fonts (usually Roman, Italic, bold, and bold Italic). It also has a lens turret which has eight lenses giving different point sizes from the font, generally 8 or 12 sizes, depending on the model. Low-range models offer sizes from 6- to 36-point, while the high-range models go to 72-point. The Compugraphic EditWriter series took the Compuwriter IV configuration and added floppy disk storage on an 8-inch, 320 KB disk. This allows the typesetter to make changes and corrections without rekeying. A CRT screen lets the user view typesetting codes and text.

Because early generations of phototypesetters could not change text size and font easily, many composing rooms and print shops had special machines designed to set display type or headlines. One such model is the PhotoTypositor, manufactured by Visual Graphics Corporation, which lets the user position each letter visually and thus retain complete control over kerning. Compugraphic's model 7200 uses the "strobe-through-a-filmstrip-through-a-lens" technology to expose letters and characters onto a 35mm strip of phototypesetting paper that is then developed by a photo processor. The 7200 is a headliner machine that read the character width from the filmstrip as the character is flashed onto the photographic paper so the unit knows how many motor pulses to move the paper. The most common unit was a low-range unit that went up to 72 points but there was also a high-range unit that went to 120 points.

Some later phototypesetters utilize a CRT to project the image of letters onto the photographic paper. This creates a sharper image, adds some flexibility in manipulating the type, and creates the ability to offer a continuous range of point sizes by eliminating film media and lenses. The Compugraphic MCS (Modular Composition System) with the 8400 typesetter is an example of a CRT phototypesetter. This machine loads digital fonts into memory from an 8-inch floppy disk. There was a dual floppy which could also be used with a 1 or 2 hard disk option. Additionally, the 8400 is able to set type-in point sizes between 5- and 120-point in 1/2-point increments. Type width could be adjusted independently of size. It had a movable CRT that covered a rectangle about 200 x 200 points and it would set all the characters in that rectangle before it moved the CRT or the paper. Common characters would still be in memory from the previous moves. It would set all the "e" and "t" then go to the next letter while it was decoding any characters it did not have in memory. If there was a size, width or font change the characters would have to be recalculated. It is extremely fast and was one of the first low-cost output systems. The 8400 used up to 12-inch photographic paper and could set camera-ready output. It was a cost reduced version of the 8600 which was faster. The 8600 came standard CRT width of 45 picas and wide width of 68 picas. The 8600 had much more computing power than the 8400 but did not have the memory to store a lot of characters so they were decoded on the fly. The unit would set the characters line at a time as long as they fit on the CRT. Small type may be set 6 to 8 lines before the photo paper was advanced. The paper advance was much faster than the 8400 CRT move or 8400 paper advance. All the fonts were stored on a hard disk. 8600 was a big step forward from the Video Setters which ended with the Video Setter V. Video setter was much like a closed circuit TV system that looked at a character on a glass grid, read its width and then scanned the character onto the photographic paper. The scan rate on the paper was fixed but the scan rate from the grid was changed to account for character size. If the vertical scan from the grid was slowed the character on the paper would be larger. Video Setters were almost all newspaper machines and limited to 45 picas wide with a maximum character size of 72 pints. It was a lot slower than the 8600.

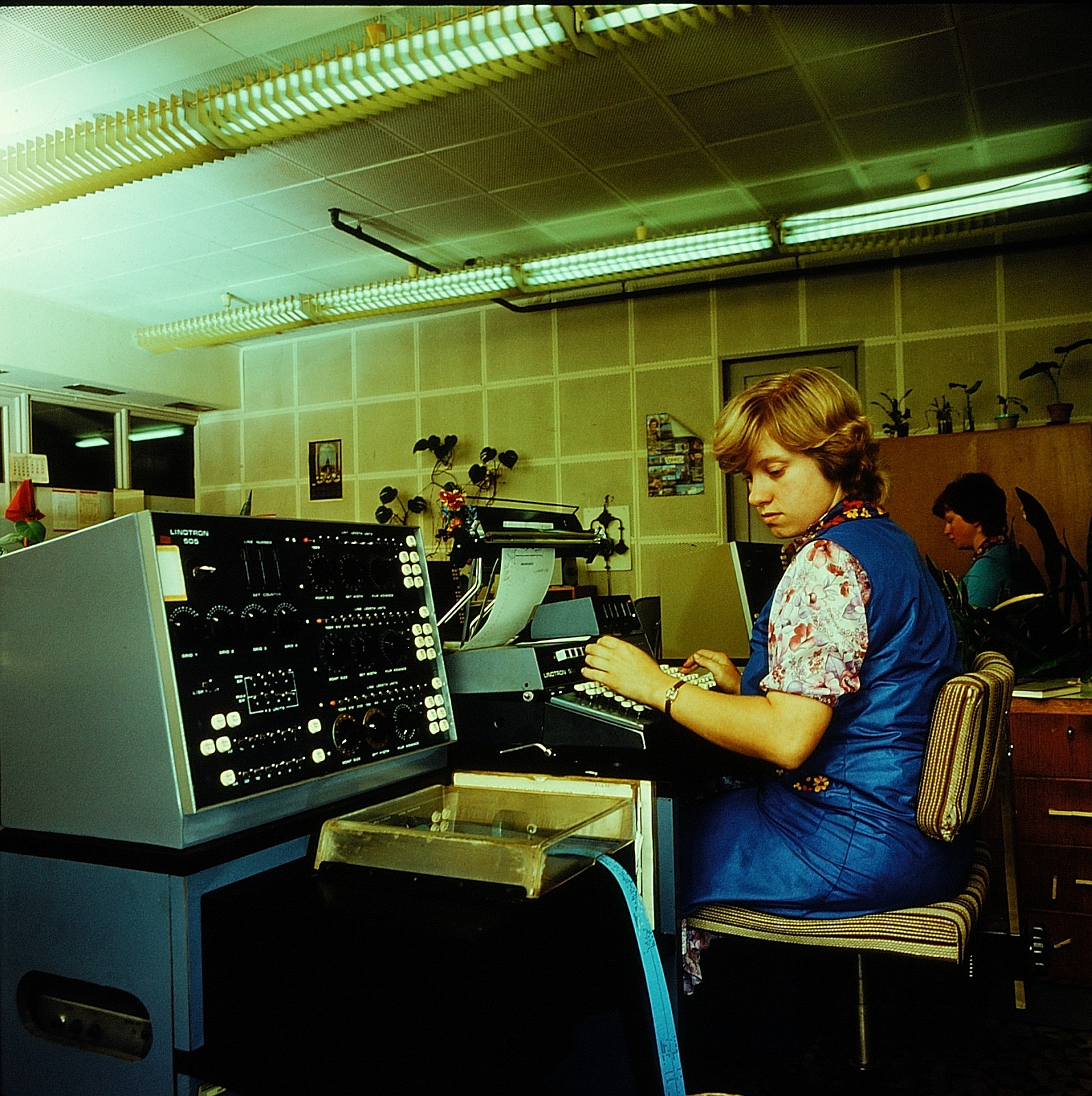
A Linotron 505 CRT phototypesetting machine in Dresden in 1983

For a fast typesetter at the time, the APS 5 from AutoLogic was hard to beat. It had a 64-speed paper advance and did not stop to set type. It figured what needed to be set in a band of data and matched the electronic advance to the mechanical advance. If there were parts of a character that were not included in the band of printing it would be printed in the next band or the band after that. The printing scan rate had to be held constant to prevent overexposing or underexposing the type. White space was not scanned but the beam would jump to the next black position. If it was working on a narrow column the paper speed was faster and if it was on a wide set of columns the paper speed was decreased. With this technology characters larger than the CRT imaging area were printed. It would print about 4000 newspaper column lines per minute whether it was 1 column at 4000 lines or 4 columns at 1000 lines each.

As phototypesetting machines matured as a technology in the 1970s, more efficient methods were found for creating and subsequently editing text intended for the printed page. Previously, hot-metal typesetting equipment had incorporated a built-in keyboard, such that the machine operator would create both the original text and the medium (lead type slugs) that would create the printed page. Subsequent editing of this copy required that the entire process be repeated. The operator would re-keyboard some or all of the original text, incorporating the corrections and new material into the original draft.

CRT-based editing terminals, which can work compatibly with a variety of phototypesetting machines, were a major technical innovation in this regard. Keyboarding the original text on a CRT screen, with easy-to-use editing commands, is faster than keyboarding on a Linotype machine. Storing the text magnetically for easy retrieval and subsequent editing also saves time.

An early developer of CRT-based editing terminals for photocomposition machines was Omnitext of Ann Arbor, Michigan. These CRT phototypesetting terminals were sold under the Singer brand name during the 1970s.

=== 1980s ===
==== Transition to computers ====
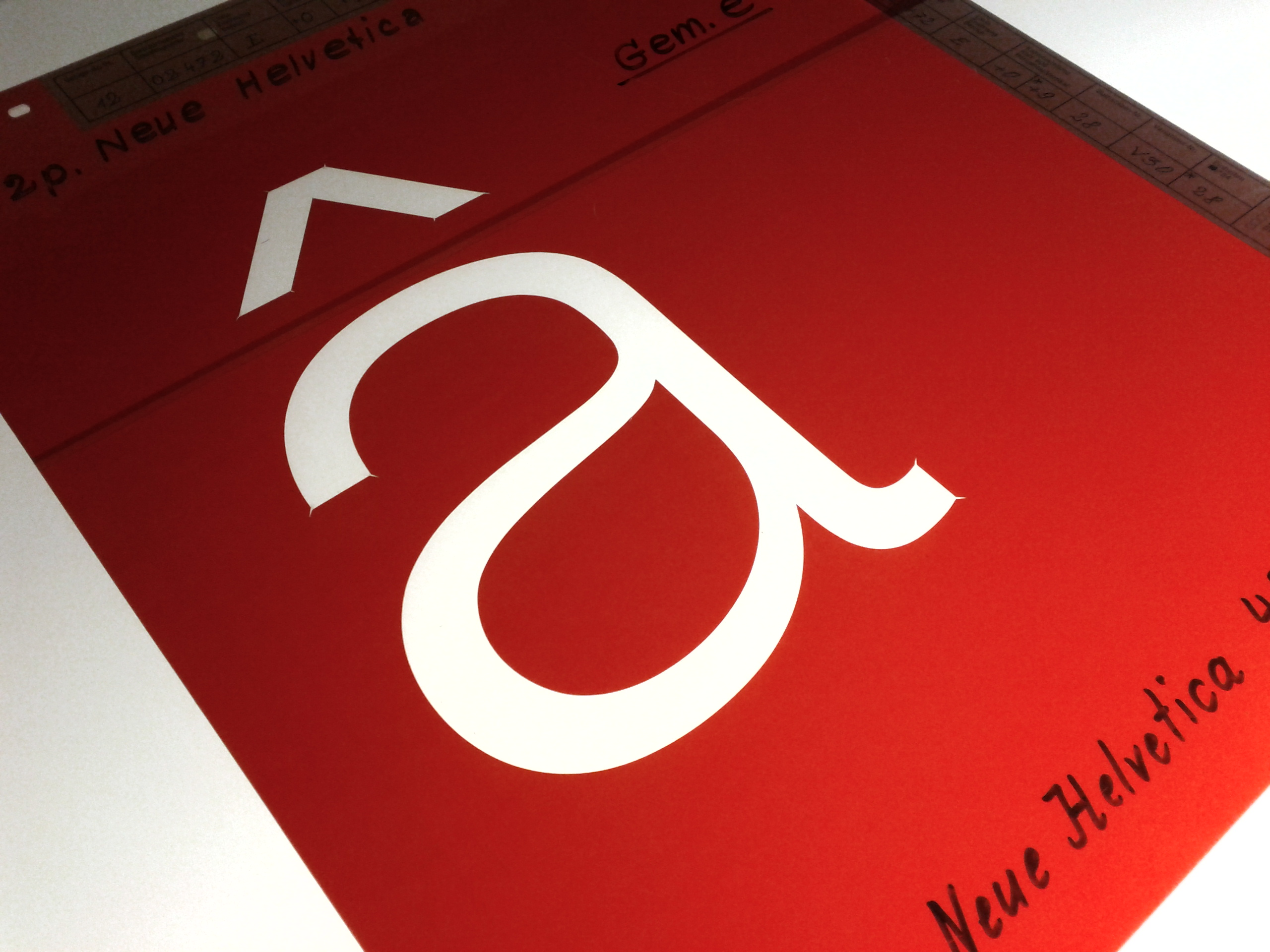
A frisket cut on rubylith film used as a master for phototypesetting. Cutting friskets by hand as a continuous, smoothly-cut curve was one of the most challenging aspects of preparing phototypes and dry transfer lettering.

Early machines have no text storage capability; some machines only display 32 characters in uppercase on a small LED screen and spell-checking is not available.

Proofing typeset galleys is an important step after developing the photo paper. Corrections can be made by typesetting a word or line of type and by waxing the back of the galleys, and corrections can be cut out with a razor blade and pasted on top of any mistakes.

Since most early phototypesetting machines can only create one column of type at a time, long galleys of type were pasted onto layout boards in order to create a full page of text for magazines and newsletters. Paste-up artists played an important role in creating production art. Later phototypesetters have multiple column features that allow the typesetter to save paste-up time.

Early digital typesetting programs were designed to drive phototypesetters, most notably the Graphic Systems CAT phototypesetter that troff was designed to provide input for. Though such programs still exist, their output is no longer targeted at any specific form of hardware. Some companies, such as TeleTypesetting Co. created software and hardware interfaces between personal computers like the Apple II and IBM PS/2 and phototypesetting machines which provided computers equipped with it the capability to connect to phototypesetting machines. With the start of desktop publishing software, Trout Computing in California introduced VepSet, which allows Xerox Ventura Publisher to be used as a front end and wrote a Compugraphic MCS disk with typesetting codes to reproduce the page layout.

In retrospect, cold type paved the way for the vast range of modern digital fonts, with the lighter weight of equipment allowing far larger families than had been possible with metal type. However, modern designers have noted that compromises of cold type, such as altered designs, made the transition to digital when a better path might have been to return to the traditions of metal type. Adrian Frutiger, who in his early career redesigned many fonts for phototype, noted that "the fonts [I redrew] don’t have any historical worth...to think of the sort of aberrations I had to produce in order to see a good result on Lumitype! V and W needed huge crotches in order to stay open. I nearly had to introduce serifs in order to prevent rounded-off corners – instead of a sans-serif the drafts were a bunch of misshapen sausages!"

== See also ==
- Diatype (machine)
- Contact copier
