= Diatype (machine) =

Printing machine

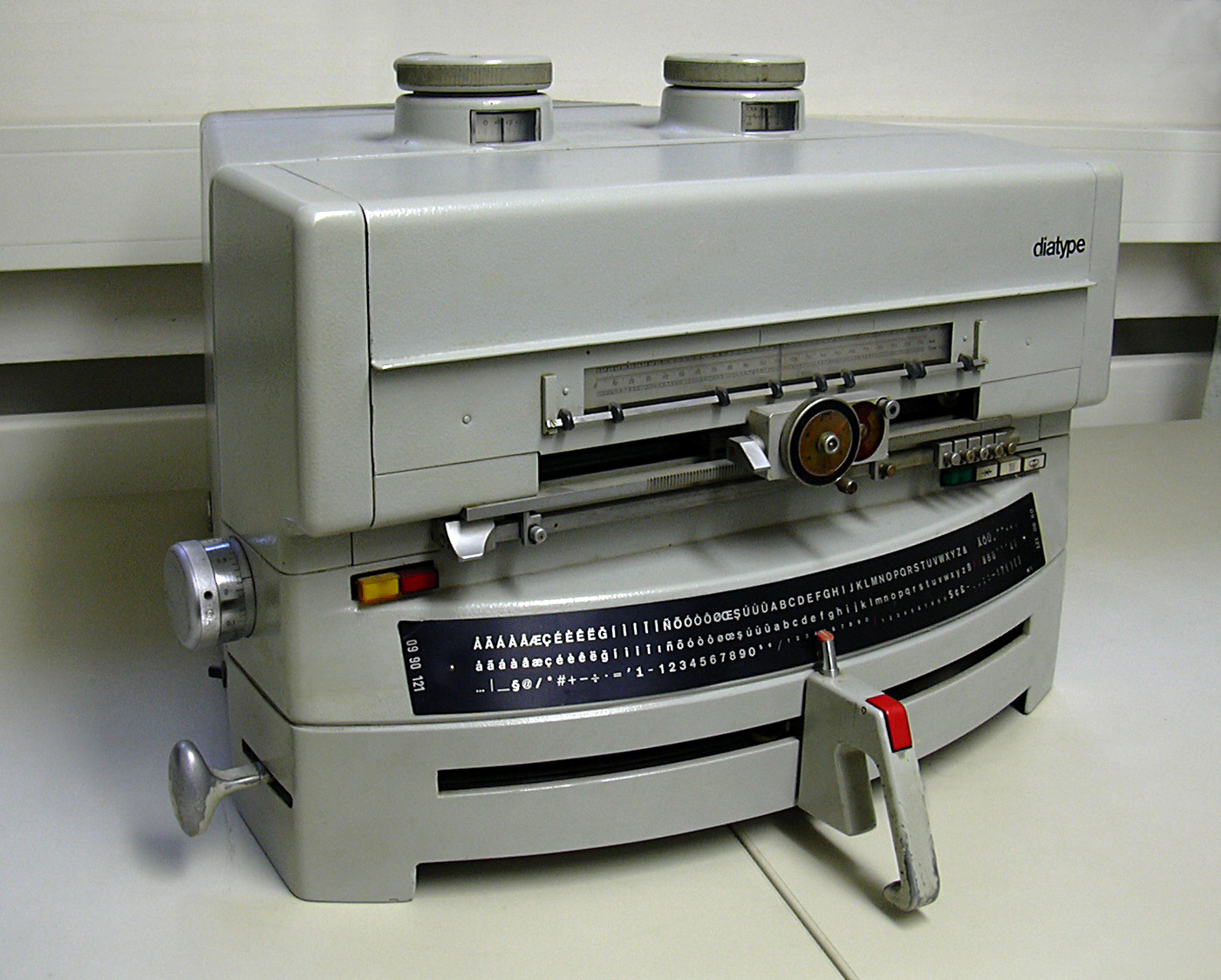
A diatype machine of the H. Berthold AG mark

A Diatype is a manual "typesetter machine" used for the phototypesetting of texts, printing them on a light-sensitive film, that can be used in different environments of the graphic arts industry.

== Operation ==
The light-sensitive film is fitted on a drum and inserted in the machine. The machine must be prepared by fitting the appropriate disk which should contain all the required fonts, these fonts are transparent on black support. Then the character that is wanted to be printed is selected by rotating a crowbar and then exposed to the light-sensitive film by means of a suitable lamp .

This way, characters are printed, in a one by one basis, until the start of a new line of text is needed, then to make the film advance, the drum is rotated a few millimeters by means of a crank designed for this purpose, and the procedure continues

Once all the composition of a complete text has been printed, the light-sensitive film is withdrawn from the drum, taken to reveal it in the dark room and after drying it up is ready for making, with the contact printer, whatever type of copies are needed (offset, negatives, etc.. )

The Diatype began to disappear with the arrival of the digital "typesetting machine" like Compugraphic and the apparition of programs of Self-publishing like TeX and others. Later word processing systems arrived to the market. All these circumstances marked the end of the Diatype.

== See also ==
- Heliographic copier
- Offset
- Contact copier
- Spirit duplicator
- Duplicating machines
- Hectograph
- Fordigraph
- List of duplicating processes

== Bibliography ==
- Sepp Dußler, Fritz Kolling: Moderne Setzerei. 4. Auflage. Verlag Dokumentation Saur KG, Pullach 1974, ISBN 3-7940-8703-8.
- Blacklow, Laura. (2000) New Dimensions in Photo Processes: to step by step manual. 3rd ed.
- Ware, M. (1999) Cyanotype: the history, science and art of photographic printing in Prussian blue. Science Museum, UK
- Sougez, Marie-Loup et al. (2006). Historia General de la Fotografía. Ediciones Cátedra, S.A. ISBN 84-376-2344-8.
