= Peñas de Cabrera =

Cave and archaeological site in Spain

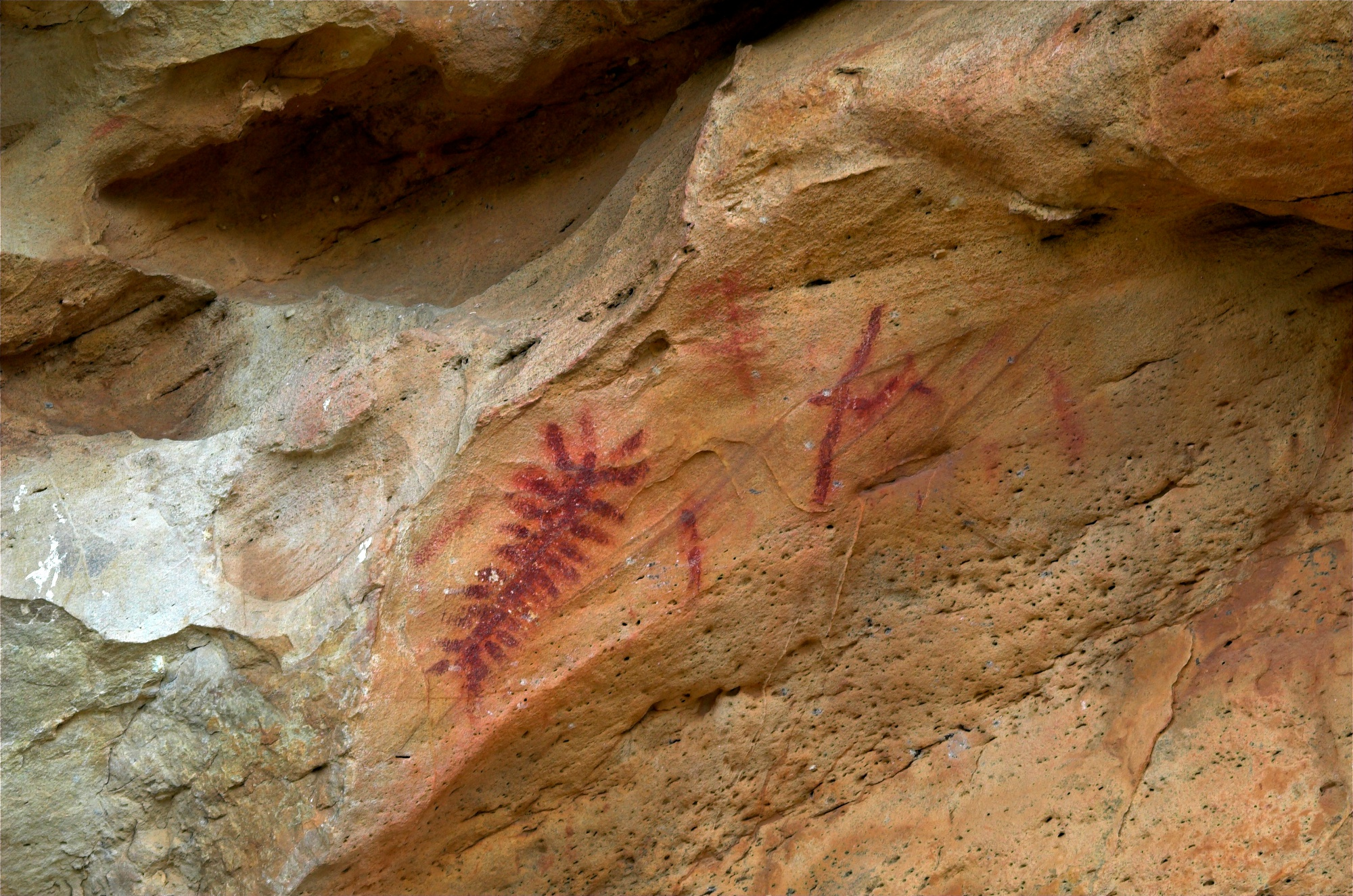

- Location within Spain
- 36°53′40″N 4°25′47″W
- Type: rock shelters
- Location: Casabermeja
- Region: Provincia de Málaga

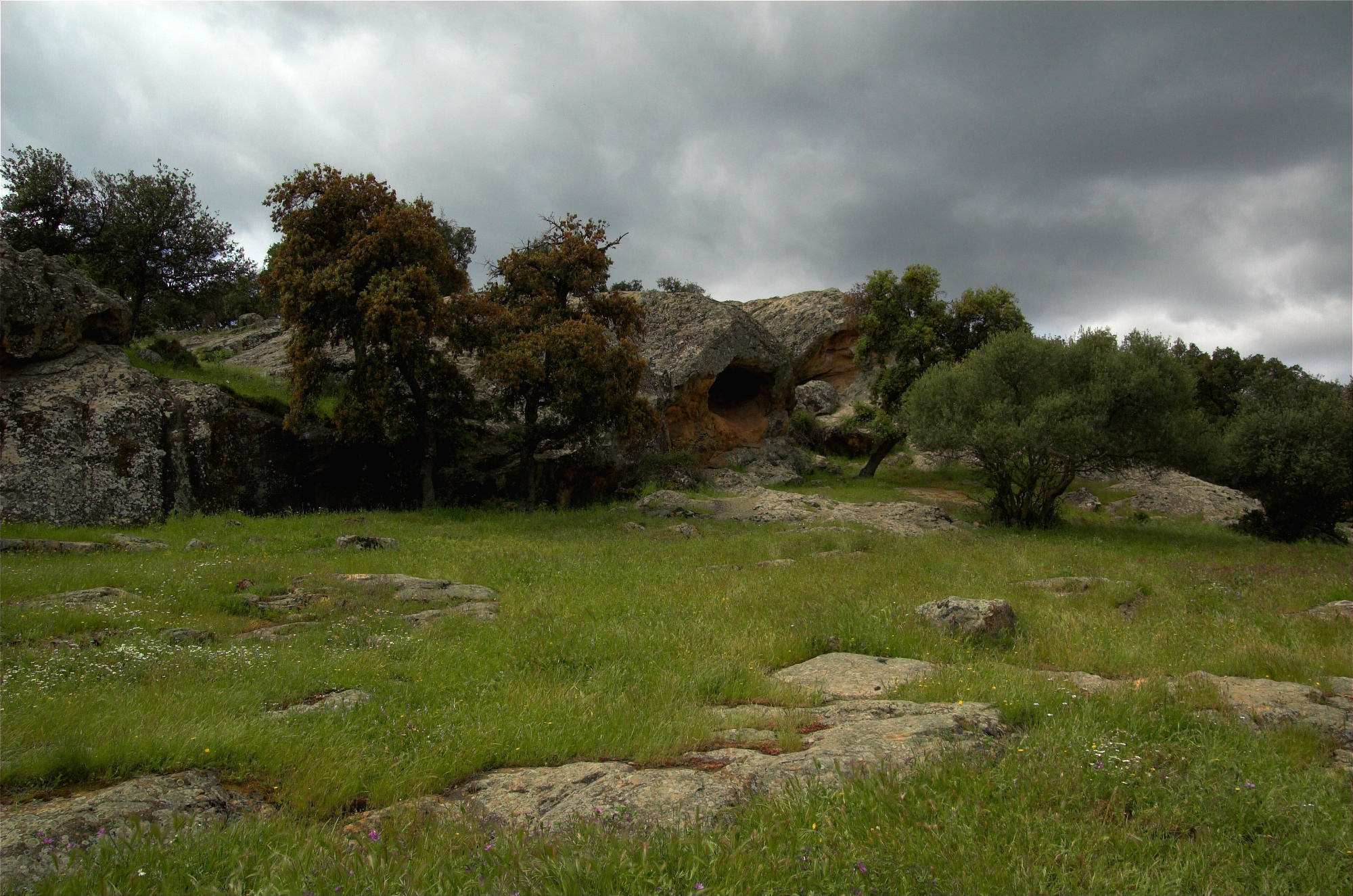
Peñas de Cabrera

The archaeological site Peñas de Cabrera, containing numerous rock shelters, is located in the municipality of Casabermeja (Spain). The entire surrounding area of Las Peñas de Cabrera, rife with natural minerals, rocks and fossils, is named after one of its districts of the same name. The entire complex of mountains and valleys consists of many shelters revealing rock art of paintings and engravings.

In the early 1970s the University of Málaga began research in Peñas de Cabrera, focusing particularly on its rock and cave paintings. Thereafter the area became well known to the scientific community, as the University had laid the groundwork for all subsequent exploration. The shelters and caves were later studied by eminent researchers who carried out archaeological surveys, tracings, and topographical mappings and drew up an inventory of rock and cave paintings. One hundred and thirty five cave paintings spread out over twenty shelters were discovered.

As of 2016 thirty-two rock shelters featuring paintings, engravings and archaeological material, mainly ceramic and flint (Silex), have been recorded. Alongside these are also a number of shelters being studied that show scientific potential, but which are pending investigation depending upon the results of further archaeological surveys.

== Rock and cave paintings ==
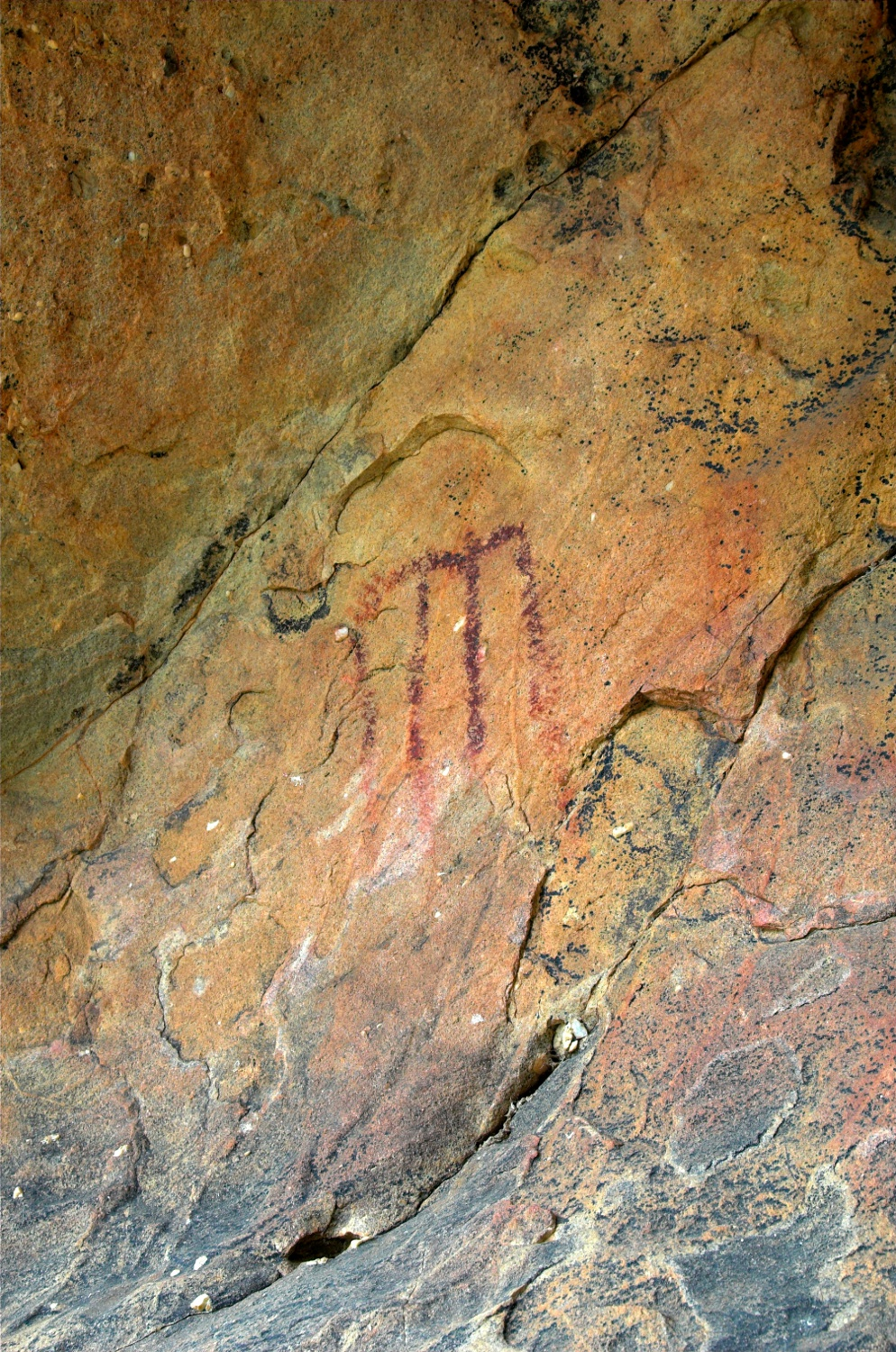
Rock and cave paintings

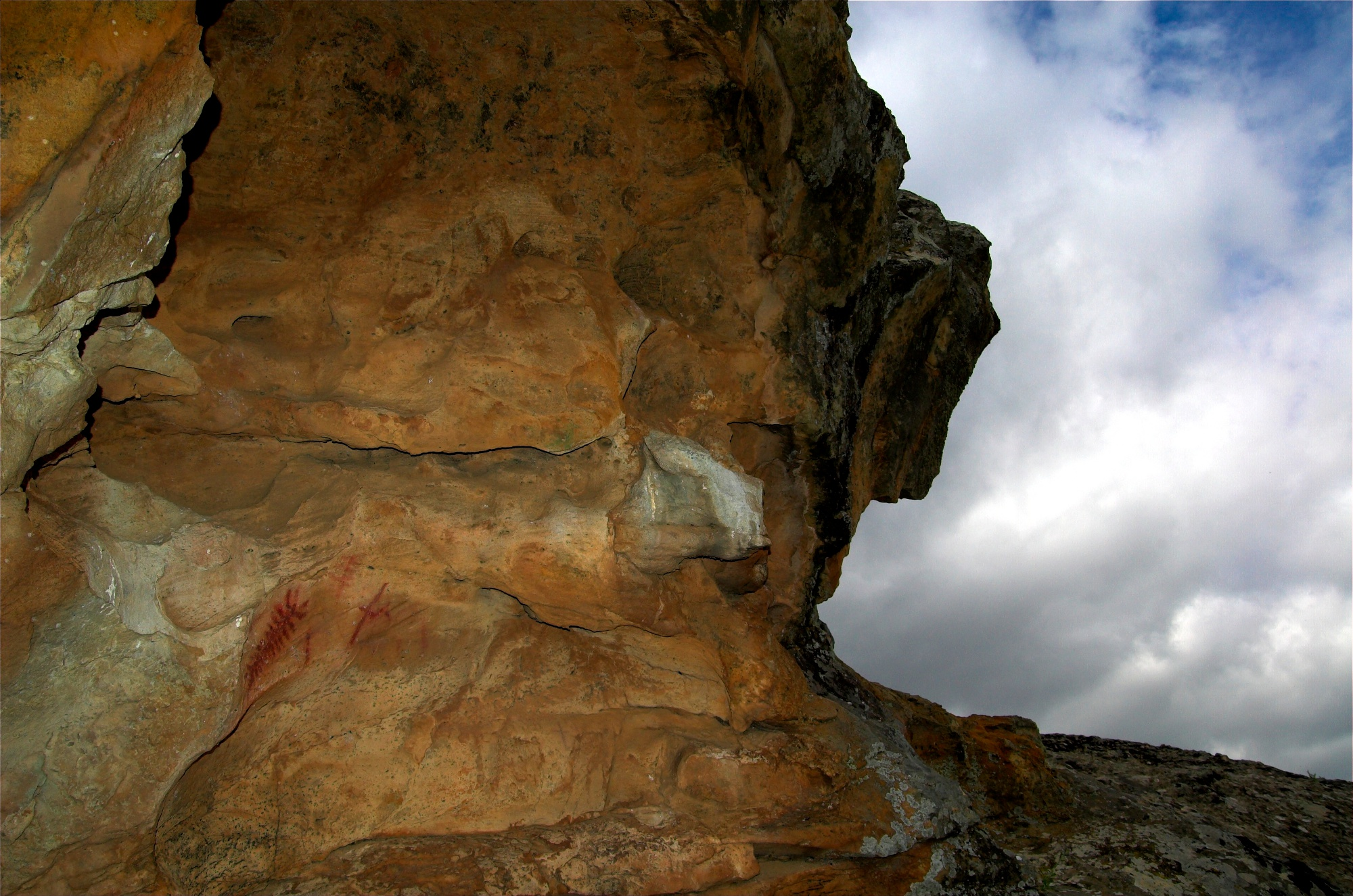
Rock and cave paintings.

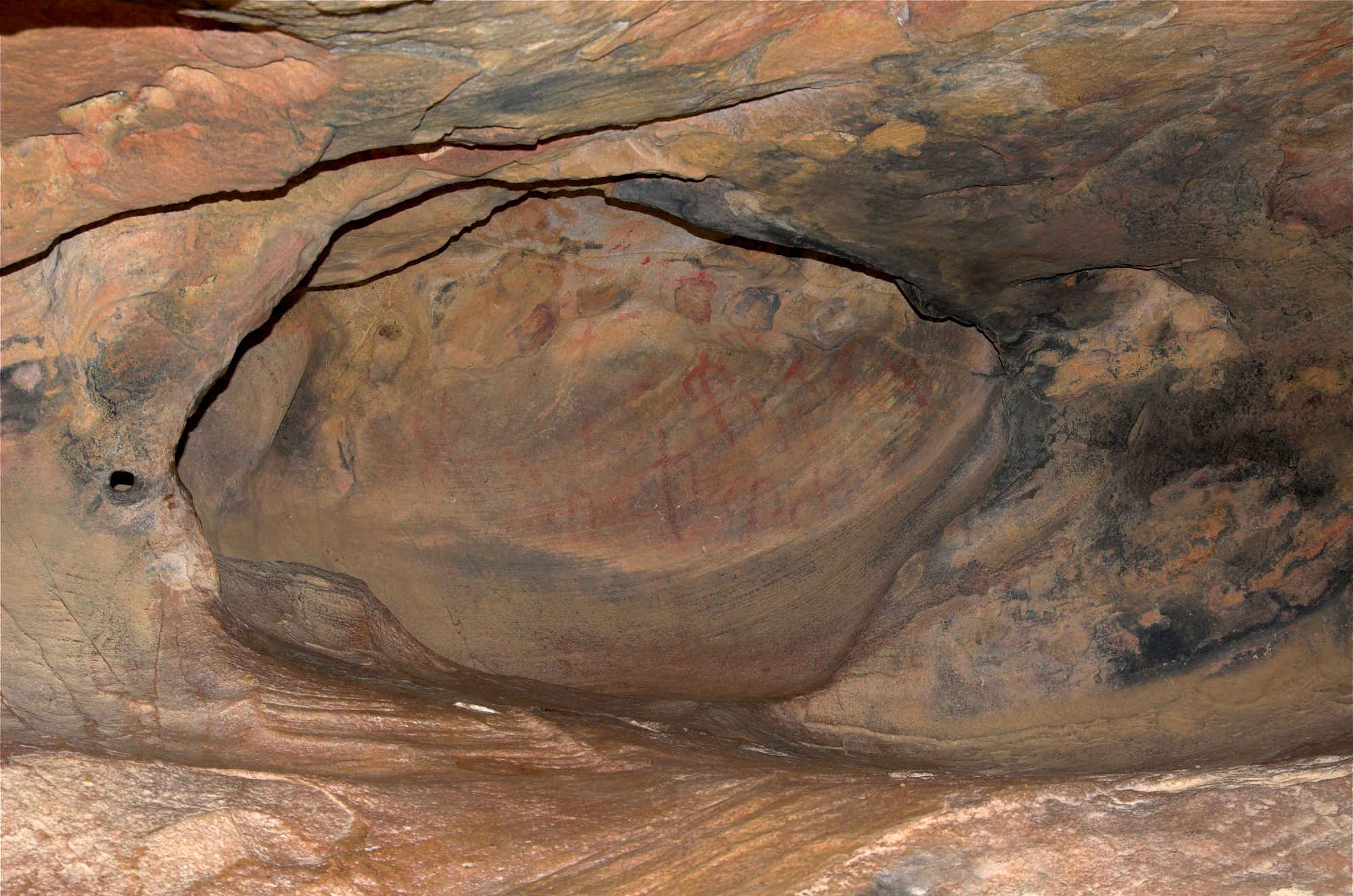
Rock and cave paintings.

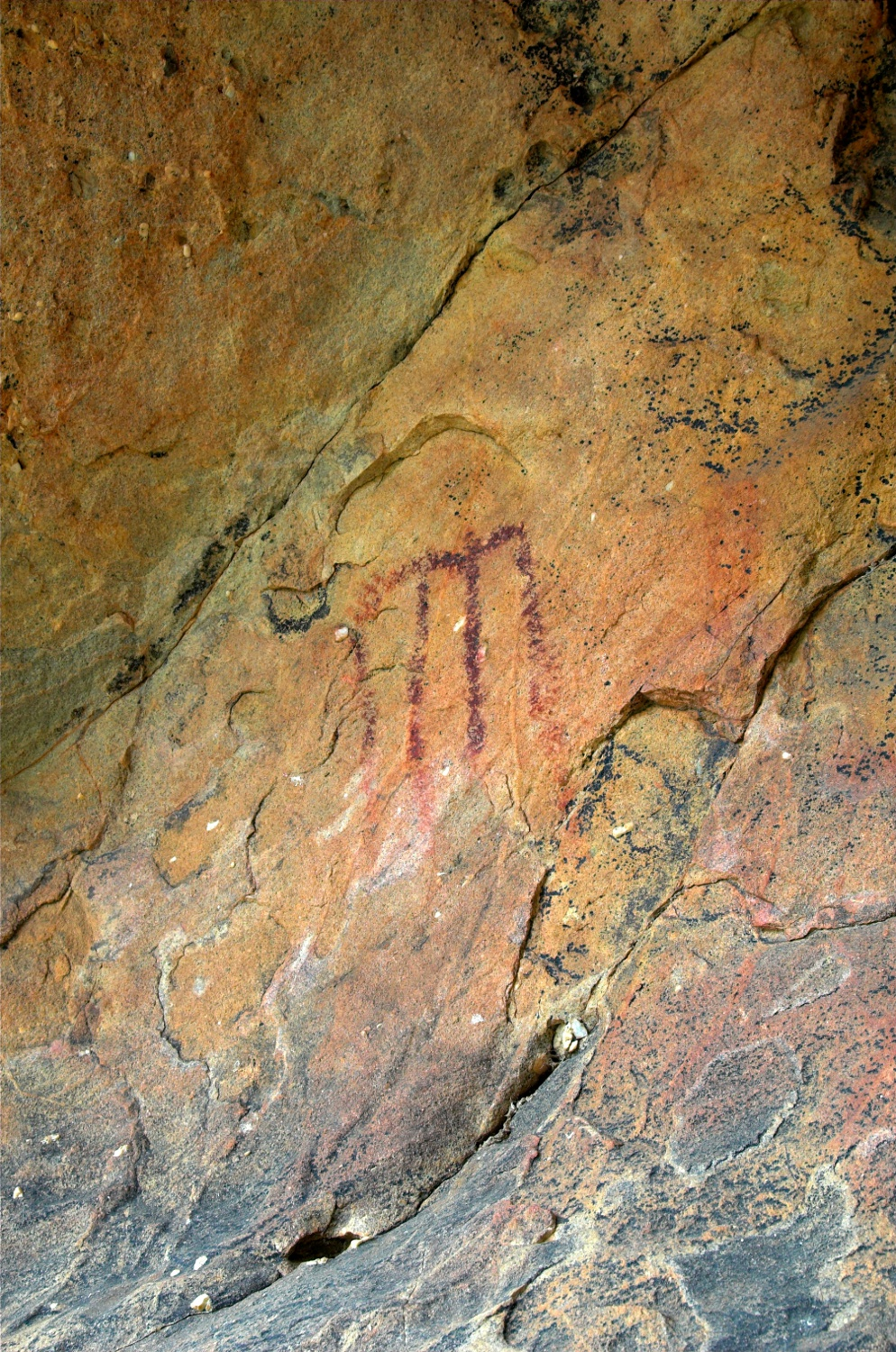
Rock and cave paintings.

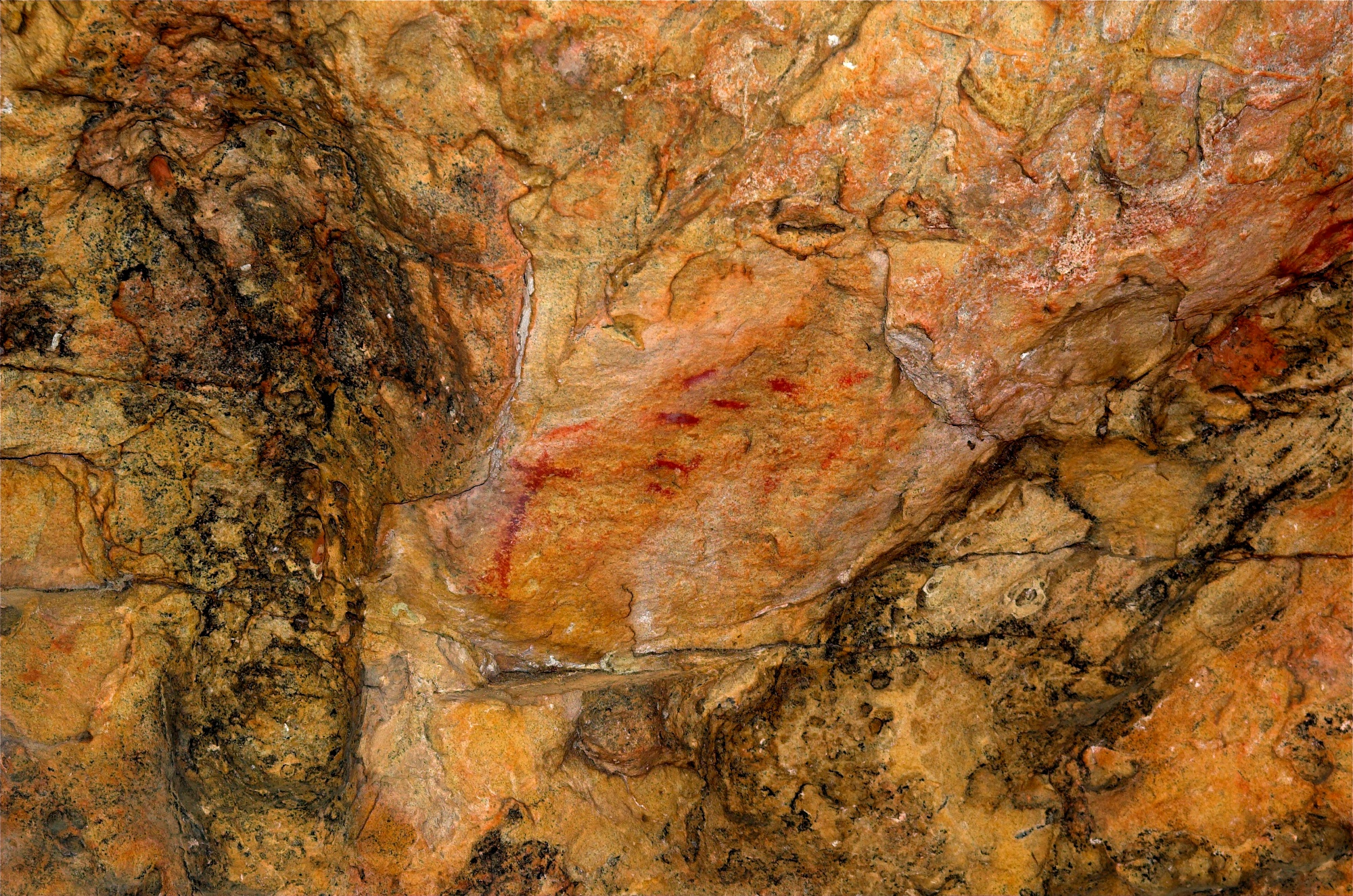
Rock and cave paintings.

The rock and cave art is found in shelters made of sandstone. The paintings, of symbolic character, appear in twenty-five of these shelters and date from the post-Paleolithic era. Within their complex designs, one finds isolated patterns grouped together. The designs were produced with different shades of red mainly using the fingers. Anthropomorphic shapes predominate and were represented in a variety of ways, some with added elements showing headdresses, costumes, weapons, etc. The painted objects themselves are also varied and remain characteristic of these displays; they comprise arrangements which are circular, branched, bi-triangular, quadrangular, braided, comb-like and ocular.

The groupings of Anthropomorphic forms, or stylized human figures, together with a quadrangular object and a stick or pole bearing an inscription, appear most frequently. Most of the time this particular group of abstract human figures is found alongside objects.

== Engravings ==
In general, there are two types of engravings, showing linear illustrations of bowls and cups, appear inside seven of the shelters. Only four of the shelters contain this one type of bowl and cup engravings while other categories of engravings appear alongside the paintings in other shelters. Bowl and cup engravings have also been discovered outside the shelters, on horizontal surface areas.

== Interpretation ==
It is believed that geological accidents unearthed these rock and cave paintings and engravings. Thus, the study of the shelters has allowed one to verify the relationship between the rock and cave paintings and the area in which they developed. Bearing witness to this act is an anthropomorphic figure, located in the shelter No. 12, with its arms in a circle. The figure can be observed from a viewpoint situated behind the top of Fraile and from the cliffs of Gomer and Dona Ana during the sunrise in the summer solstice. It now seems apparent that the shelters were not only places of symbols and worship, as even the most mundane activities took place, as shown in shelter number 51 which has a silex workshop. It is also speculated that there may be other reasons for the unusual land-forms one finds in el Torcal.

Connected to the shelters are a number of structures, the meaning of which is difficult to interpret because of their uniqueness. They are thought to be enclosures formed by stones in some cases. Specifically, the larger structure, also known as "the atrium", is in the shape of a semicircle and stands in front of the shelters.

== Dolmen del Tajillo del Moro ==
The Dolmen del Tajillo del Moro complements the rock and cave painting of Peñas de Cabrera and shares a similarity to its ritual and symbolic nature. After its excavation, a Megalithic structure was found consisting of an oval chamber and a corridor divided into two parts which served as a tomb for three individuals. The trousseau is made of ceramic material containing globular and hemispherical bowls and plates, largely completed with pieces of silex (flint), among other things.

== Legal status ==
On December 22, 2012, the Ministry of Culture of the Andalusian Historical Heritage Institute along with the Council of Andalusia decreed and made into law that Peñas de Cabrera would be considered an official archaeological and historical site. At that time, it was recommended and accepted that certain categories in the area would receive special protection. A procedure for registration and delimitation was initiated into the General Catalog of the Society of the Andalusian Historical Heritage of Cultural Interest. Groups named which would benefit from this classification included 'the ensemble of cave and rock paintings of Peñas Cabrera', 'cave paintings of Peñas Cabrera', the 'rock shelter complex of Peñas Cabrera' and 'the cave shelters of Peñas Cabrera'. The official documents mentioned the contents of each cave shelter in meticulous detail, the measurements of their precise area, the number of cave shelters containing each type of object, along with many other specifics and technical particularities.

== Notes ==
1.Tracing paper has the ability for an image to be traced onto it. When tracing paper is placed onto a bas relief, the picture is easily viewable through the tracing paper. Thus, it becomes easy to find edges in the picture and trace the image onto the tracing paper.
2. Megalithic art is art carved onto megaliths in prehistoric Europe.
