= Rosin paper =

Heavy duty felt paper used in construction

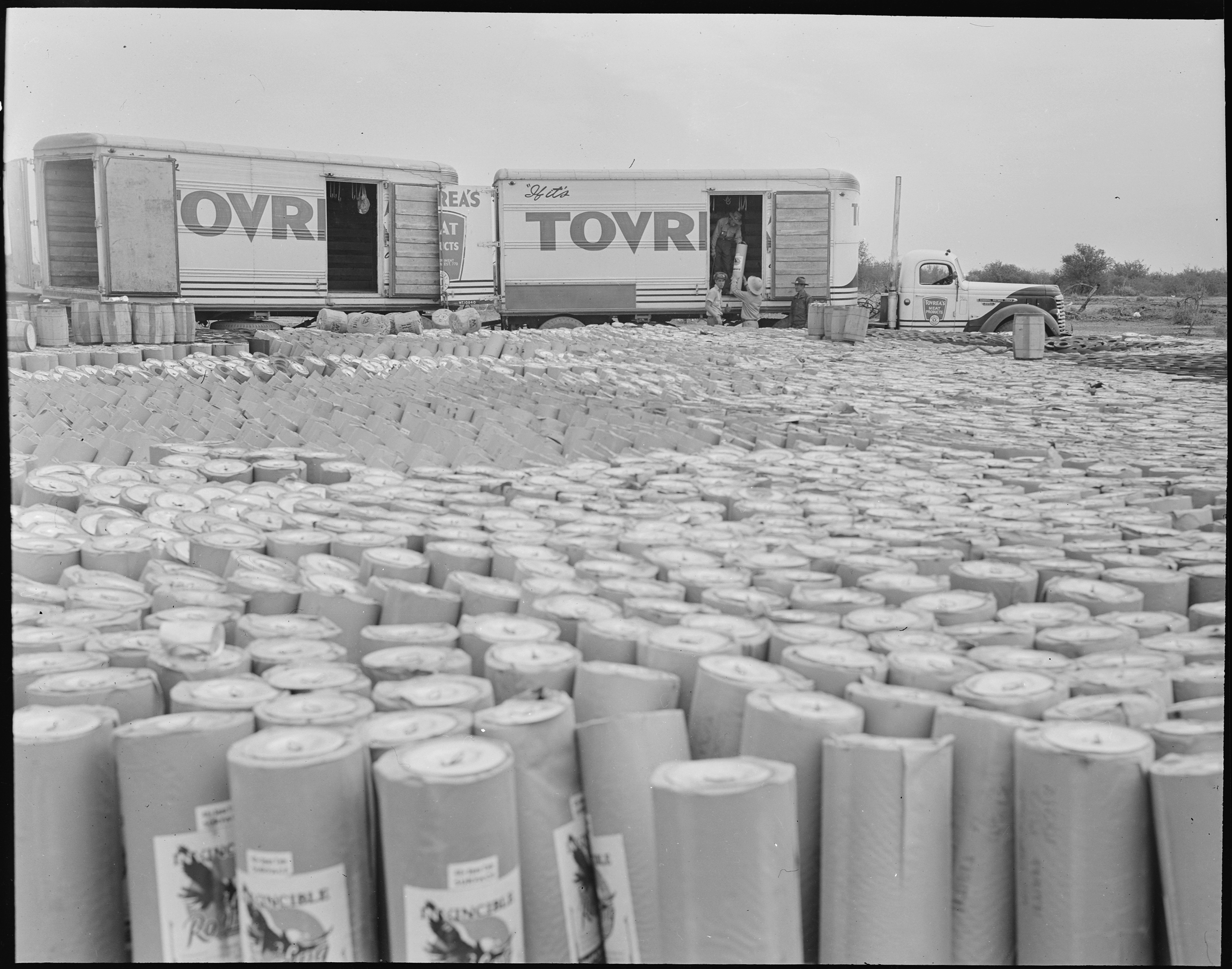
A large quantity of rosin paper to be used in roofing

Rosin paper (red building paper, red rosin paper, brown rosin paper, slip sheet paper, rosin-sized sheathing paper, and building paper) is a heavy duty felt paper used in construction such as underlayment under flooring and siding.

== Description and history ==
Rosin paper is a heavy duty felt paper. It is used in construction such as underlayment under flooring and siding. In building construction, rosin paper is used to reduce air and moisture flow through a wall or floor, create a "friction barrier" so different materials can slip by each other as they expand and contract, keep dust from working down through a floor, and minimize squeaking. Rosin paper is also sometimes used to temporarily protect a work site during construction.

Papers from the Middle Ages were sized with gelatine, but the invention of the paper-making machine in the late 18th century demanded a better size resulting in utilization of rosin. Rosin paper may have a polyurethane coating to improve moisture resistance and tearing. It contains abietic acid, and comes in many size rolls up to 96 inches (2.4 m) wide.

Alum-rosin size was invented by Moritz Friedrich Illig in Germany in 1807 and is known to have been used as a building paper by 1850.

== Names ==
Rosin paper is known by a number of different names, including red building paper, red rosin paper, brown rosin paper, slip sheet paper, rosin-sized sheathing paper, and building paper. The name rosin-sized sheathing paper (commonly used to describe the material), comes from the rosin used in the paper, the process of sizing it to add the rosin, and its use by builders.

== See also ==
- Construction paper
- Tar paper
- Felt paper
- Card stock
- Wax paper
- Tracing paper
- Parchment paper
- Coated paper
- Kraft paper
- Vulcanized fibre
