= Photolith film =

Type of film

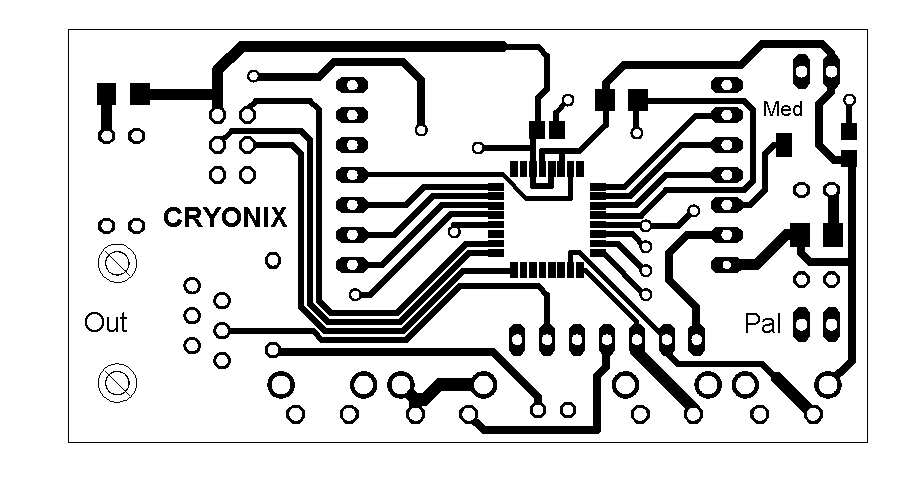
A photolitah film as used in PCB-s contact copiers.

A photolith film is a transparent film, made with some sort of transparent plastic (formerly made of acetate). Nowadays, with the use of laser printers and computers, the photolith film can be based on polyester, vegetable paper or laser film paper. It is mainly used in all photolithography processes.

A color image, or polychromatic, is divided into four basic colors: cyan, the magenta, the yellow and black (the so-called system CMYK (short name from cyan, magenta , yellow and black ), generating four photolith film images, a photo filtered with each of the three basic colors plus a B&W film (addition of the three). For black-and-white images, such as text or simple logos, only one photolith film is needed.

The photolith film it is sometimes recorded by an optical laser process on an imagesetter machine, coming from a digital file, or by a photographic process in a contact copier, if a physical copy of the original already exist. In the old offset printing plates acquire text or images to be printed after being sensitized from a photolith film.

The photolith films, as well as vegetable and the laser films, are used to store plates, screens or other media sensitive to light as a backup for repeating their processes in the future. They normally store the information of the three or four separated colours on monochrome photolith films.

== See also ==
- Azo compound
- Contact copier
- Ozalid
- Diazo copier
