= Whiteprint =

Document reproduction produced by using the diazo chemical process

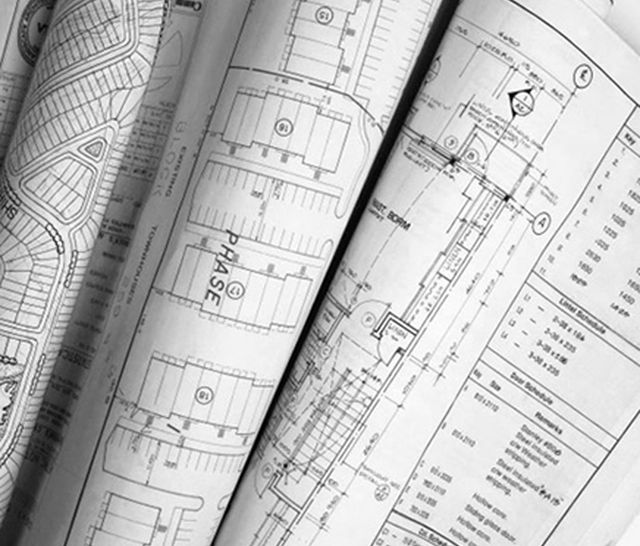
Whiteprint plan copy.

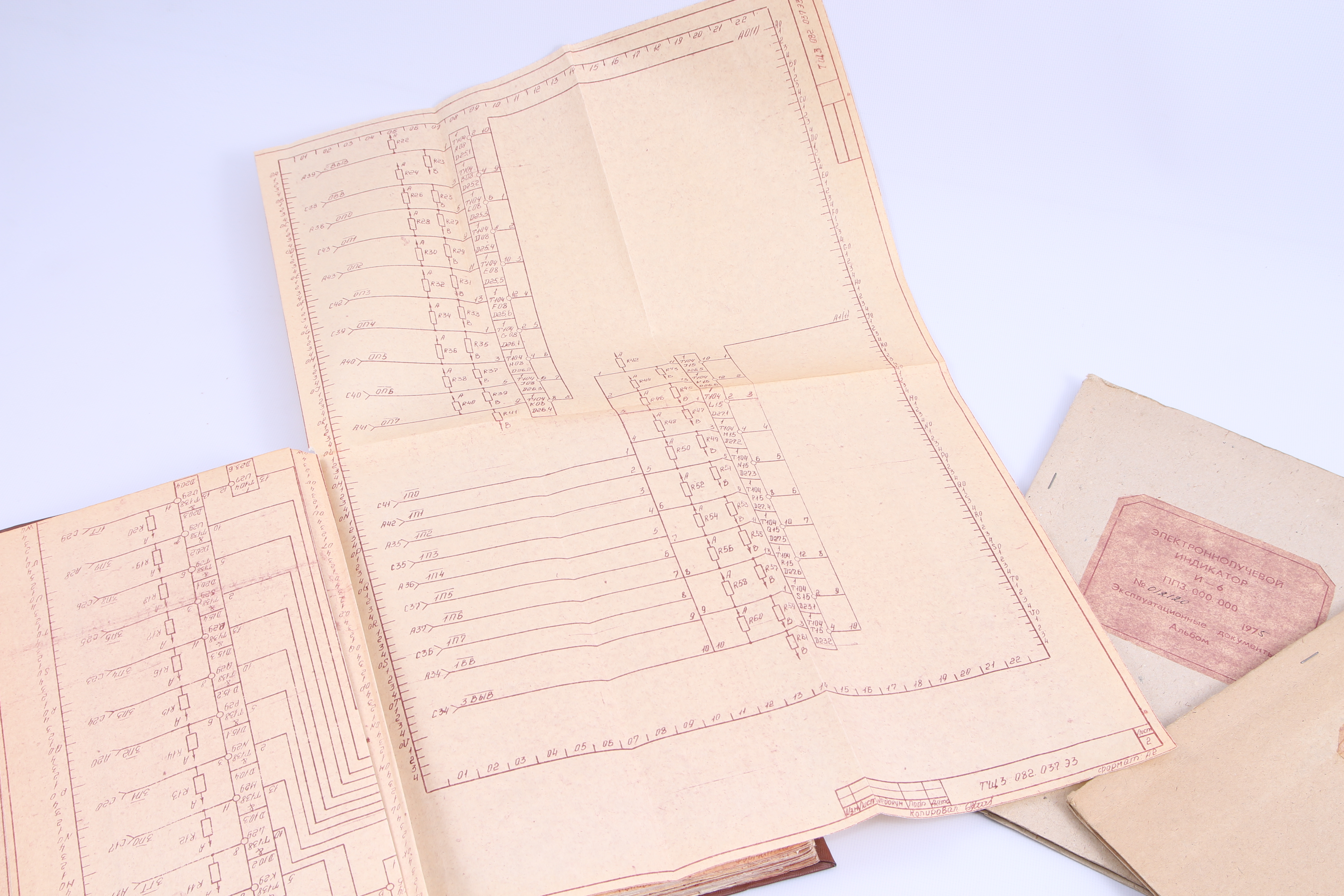
USSR whiteprints. 1970's.

Whiteprint describes a document reproduction produced by using the diazo chemical process. It is also known as the blue-line process since the result is blue lines on a white background. It is a contact printing process that accurately reproduces a translucent original in size, but can reproduce only limited tonal range and no color.

The light sensitivity of the chemicals used was known in the 1890s and several related printing processes were patented at that time. Whiteprinting replaced the blueprint process for reproducing architectural and engineering drawings around the turn of the 20th century because the process was simpler and involved fewer toxic chemicals. A blue-line print is not permanent and will fade if exposed to light for weeks or months, but a print that lasts only a few months was sufficient as a working drawing for many purposes, and the original vellum drawings could be stored and reprinted as needed. Whiteprinting became obsolete around the turn of the 21st Century as technical drawing was replaced by computer-aided design and thus digital pen plotters or large-format printers (still sometimes colloquially called "blueprint printers") became favored.

== The diazo printing process ==
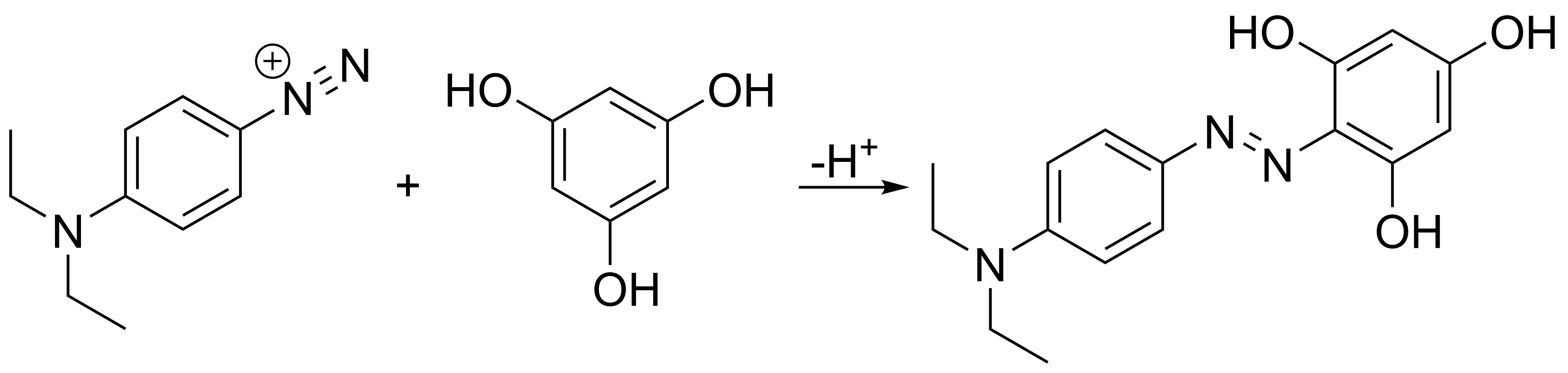
Left is a diazonium cation, which combines with a coupler (middle) to give a deeply colored azo dye (right).

Two components underpin diazo printing:

1. Diazonium salt: a light-sensitive chemical
2. The coupler: a colorless chemical that combines with the salt to produce color

In a related sense, the process relies on two properties of diazonium compounds:

1. They are deactivated by light, i.e. they degrade irreversibly to products that cannot form deeply colored dyes
2. The un-degraded compounds react with a (colorless) coupling agent to give the deeply colored product(s)

In a variety of combinations and strengths, these two chemicals are mixed in water and coated onto paper. The resulting coating is then dried yielding the specially treated paper commercially sold as diazo paper. This solution can also be applied to polyester film or to vellum.

The process starts with original documents that have been created on a translucent medium. Such media include polyester films, vellums, linens, and translucent bond papers (bonds). Any medium that allows some light to pass through typically works as a master; the desired durability of the master determines the choice. Depending on the thickness and type of the master, the intensity of the UV exposure light is adjusted according to media types commonly used for masters in any particular shop. Similarly, the speed control (for setting the speed at which the sheets are pulled through the machine) is likewise typically pre-marked in any particular shop, having been optimized based on trial runs.

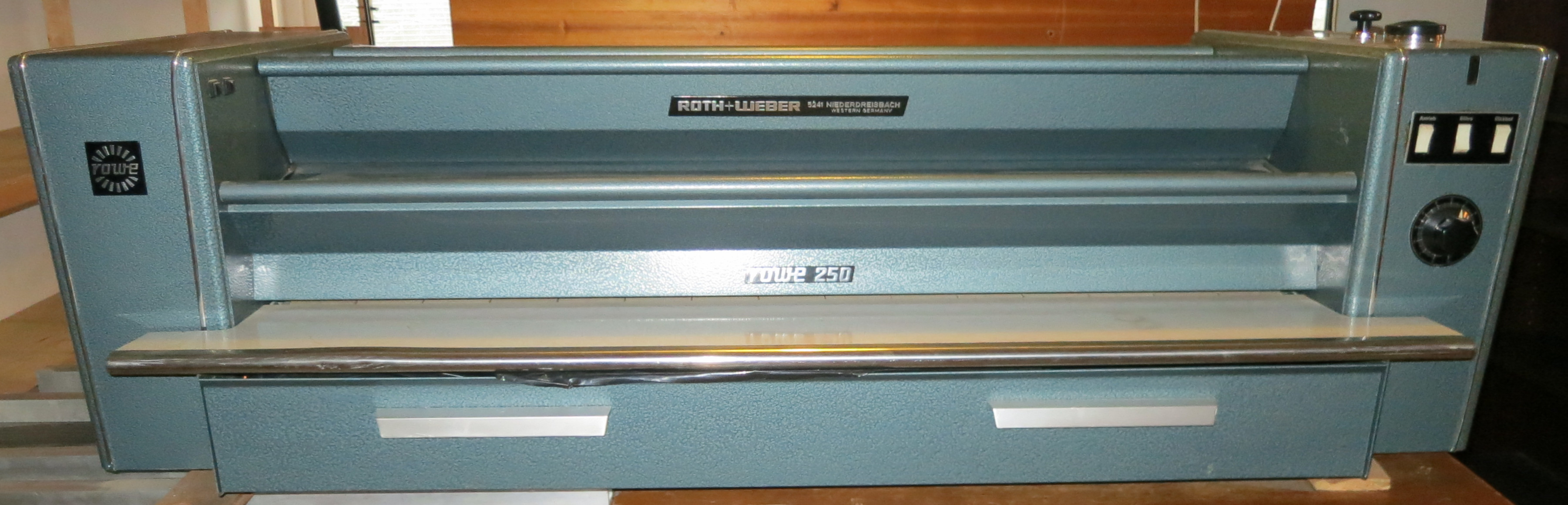
A 1970 diazo Rowe 250 copier by Rowe Roth Weber (Germany).

The original document is laid on top of the chemically-coated side of a sheet of diazo paper, which is retrieved from a light-protected flat file, and the two sheets are fed into the diazo duplicator, being pulled into the machine by rotating rubber friction wheels. There are two chambers inside the machine. The first is the exposure area, where the sandwich of the two sheets (the master and the diazo paper) passes in front of an ultraviolet lamp. Ultraviolet light penetrates the original and neutralizes the light-sensitive diazonium salt wherever there is no image on the master. These areas become the white areas on the copy. Once this process is complete, the undeveloped image at the locations where the UV light could not penetrate can often be seen as very light yellow or white marks/lines on the diazo sheet. This completes the exposure phase.

Next, the original is peeled from the diazo paper as the sandwich of master and diazo exits the machine, and the diazo sheet alone is fed into the developing chamber. Here, fumes of ammonium hydroxide create an extremely alkaline environment. Under these conditions, the azodyes (couplers) react with the remaining diazonium salt and undergo a chemical reaction that results in the unexposed lines changing color from invisible (or yellow) to a visible dark color. The range of colors for these lines is usually blue or black, but sepia (a brownish hue) is also quite popular. When making multiple copies of an original no more than four or five copies can typically be made at a time, due to the build-up of ammonia fumes, even with ventilation fans in the duplication room. A slight delay of perhaps five minutes is often required for the fumes to subside enough to permit making additional copies if no ventilation exists. Many blueprint shops ran ventilation ducts from the machines to the outside. Smaller and mid-size blueprint machines were often outfitted with neutralizers which absorbed some of the ammonia for some time.

If the lines are too light, it is also possible to run the blue line through the developing chamber once more, which often increases the contrast of the lines relative to the base media. Repeated lack of contrast and light prints is also a tip-off that the operator needs to adjust the speed or amount of ammonia. Sometimes both the master and the diazo print are inadvertently fed through the developing chamber together. If this occurs, one simply peels the master from the diazo paper and runs the diazo sheet through the developer once more to fully develop the lines.

Diazo printing was one of the most economical methods to reproduce large engineering and architectural drawings for most of the 20th Century.

== Fading prints ==
A quirk of diazo blueline prints is that with continued exposure to ultraviolet light, either from natural sunlight or from typical office fluorescent lighting, a blueline copy can fade over months (indoors) or just days (outdoors), becoming illegible. This fading process thus requires reduplication of the original documents every few months in a typical office for any project using bluelines. Hence, blueline drawings that are used as engineering working copy prints have to be protected when not in use by storing them in flat files in the dark. Incandescent lighting was often used in areas where blueline engineering prints needed to be posted on a wall for long periods to hinder rapid fading.

Improperly exposed bluelines are more likely to fade at an increased rate since the chemical reaction in the ammonia phase continues until the process is completed. But also properly exposed bluelines should not be exposed to the elements, and bluelines kept in flat files or hanging on racks in a cool, dry room often retain the majority of their lines and can be subsequently scanned into a digital format for various purposes.

== Demise of the technology ==
The blueline print process was largely abandoned within the architectural/engineering community by 1999. Contributing factors were the development of computer-aided drafting and printing, the speed of machine printing, and the introduction of larger xerographic machines or large format printers from companies like Ricoh and Xerox. The high cost of blueline production materials and equipment, the fact that the prints themselves faded in sunlight, and the need to use the pungent chemical ammonia as a developer sped up its replacement.

== See also ==
- Azo compound
- Blueprint
- Heliographic copier
- Ozalid
