= Bond paper =

Type of writing paper

Bond paper is a high-quality durable writing paper with a paper density greater than 50 g/m^{2}. The most common weights are 60 g/m^{2} (16 lb), 75 g/m^{2} (20 lb) and 90 g/m^{2} (24 lb). The name comes from having originally been made for documents such as government bonds. Bond is used for letterheads and other stationery, and as paper for electronic printers. Widely employed for graphic work involving pencil, pen and felt-tip marker, bond paper can sometimes contain rag fibre pulp, which produces a stronger, though rougher, sheet of paper.

== See also ==
- Coated paper, also high-quality, but bond paper may be coated or uncoated
- Inkjet paper
- Tracing paper
