= Contact copier =

Device for copying images

A contact copier (also known as contact printer) is a device used to copy an image by illuminating a film negative with the image in direct contact with a photosensitive surface (film, paper, plate, etc.). The more common processes are negative, where clear areas in the original produce an opaque or hardened photosensitive surface, but positive processes are available. The light source is usually an actinic bulb internal or external to the device.

Commercial contact printers or process cameras usually use a pump-operated vacuum frame where the original and the photosensitive surface are pressed together against a flat glass by a grooved rubber mat connected to the vacuum source. A timer-controlled mercury vapor (arc or fluorescent) light source is on the other side of the glass.

== Uses ==
The contact copying process was used in the early days of photography and sunlight-exposed blueprints; it is still used in amateur photography, silkscreen printing, offset printing, and photochemical machining, such as the manufacture of printed circuit boards. By the early 20th century, blueprinting (producing white lines) or diazo blue line printing used contact-rollers rather than flat-glass exposure.

Silkscreen printing and photochemical machining originally were based on gum bichromate photosensitive materials, where exposure to intense ultraviolet light made previously-soluble gum or gelatin colloids insoluble; after exposure, the exposed surface was washed in water and the unexposed coating dissolved, leaving the hardened gum or gelatin to resist the passage of the silk-screen ink or the metal-etching solution. Offset printing can use either a negative plate, where the hardened, exposed photosensitive coating attracts ink and repels water, or a positive plate, where the exposed photosensitive coating decomposes or exposes the metal, water-attracting surface.

=== Photography ===
The contact copier is used for duplication of negative or positive prints obtaining what are called contact prints, that is, to reproduce on paper or film, a photographic negative or positive of exactly the same size of the original. (With normal photographic non inverting processes, black generates white on the target while white generates black). It was the common mode to make prints until it began the use of the alternative photographic enlarger. There are some models with internal light source constructed as a closed box, in which one or more lamps illuminate the negative through an opal or frosted glass.

The reproduction is done by placing the negative on top of the glass and then the photo paper with the emulsion in contact with the negative. The negative role fits the body, the lid is closed applying some pressure against the glass to prevent blur; then proceed to impress photographic paper by turning on the interior light (contact copier) or an external focus, in the last case, usually from a photographic enlarger. Exposure time can be controlled "manually" or using a timer that controls the light source for a preset time and with greater precision.

=== Whiteprint ===
In the process of whiteprint copying , (essentially a diazotype process), a dynamic contact copier is used (similar to the manual action of exposing both sheets strongly bonded directly to the sunlight.). The exposition is made progressively as the twin rollers pull the two papers together (original and copy) against a source of ultraviolet light, typically a powerful black light lamp . The original plan (on a transparent support) and the diazo paper are introduced, in perfect contact, within the pinch rollers of the contact copier. The sensitized paper, has a photosensitive coating -an impregnation of diazo - covering the surface of the paper. Once exposed, the copied paper is immersed in a developer solution made from ammonia (or ammonia vapor) converting the parts of the paper not exposed to the light source to a characteristic dark violet colour (blue-line).

=== Silkscreen ===
In screenprinting it is normally use a contact copier box with several fluorescent tubes close to the silk frame. The emulsion reacts depending on the amount of light received, for that reason it is important to make some tests for determining the exposure time. Usually for a "box type" contact copier, exposure is usually not more than one minute. In the industrial type contact copiers with actinic lamp placed at a distance, exposure time can be about 20 minutes.

The photolith (also called "Art") is placed under the frame against the emulsion. The black portions of photolith film does not let light into the relevant parts of the coated silk, therefore, in these parts Emulsion will not heal and may be subsequently washed, keep in mind that there must be no gap between the photolith and the silk, to achieve that purpose any element with enough weight may be used to press the silk against the photolith (or a vacuum pump in professional machines).

=== Offset ===
In CTF offset technology, a photolith is placed in direct contact with the printing plate and pressed with an opaque lid that sometimes has a vacuum pump that helps making a good contact. The plate comes coated with a layer of photoresist in which a (negative) inverted image is formed with respect to the original photolith and after the transfer of information (burning) it's accomplished, then, after undergoing a developing process, the plate will be ready to be used in an offset printer.

The process shares some fundamental principles with the photographic processes, since the pattern engraved on the plate is generated by exposure to light with an image created in a contact copier using an optical mask. This procedure is comparable to the high-precision method of the version used to make printed circuit boards.

=== Printed circuits ===
The contact copier is used today, particularly in the areas hobbyist, for the photoengraving of prototype printed circuit boards (PCBs) before being sent to production (artisanal creation ). Substantially similar to the contact printer used in photography, this variant usually uses ultraviolet lamps to impress a copper base specifically pre-sensitized.

Burned by exposure to light parts reproduce patterns drawn on a transparent photolith film on a pre-sensitized plate (epoxy or Bakelite). This pre-sensitized plate comprises an insulating plate (epoxy resin or bakelite), adhered with a layer of copper, and coated with a varnish layer sensitized. The varnish is sensitive to UV rays, which weaken or strengthen its structure depending on whether a "positive" or "negative" process. Photolith film printed parts (usually black), inserted between the light source and the pre-sensitized plate, protect the varnish from the UV. The base copper impressed must then be engraved in a specific bath (usually ferric chloride FeCl_{3}), that removes the excess copper.

== See also ==
- Lightbox
- Azo compound
- Blueprint
- Ozalid
- Heliographic copier
- Thermal copier
- Verifax copier
- Diatype (machine)
