= Tracing paper =

Paper made to have low opacity, allowing light to pass through

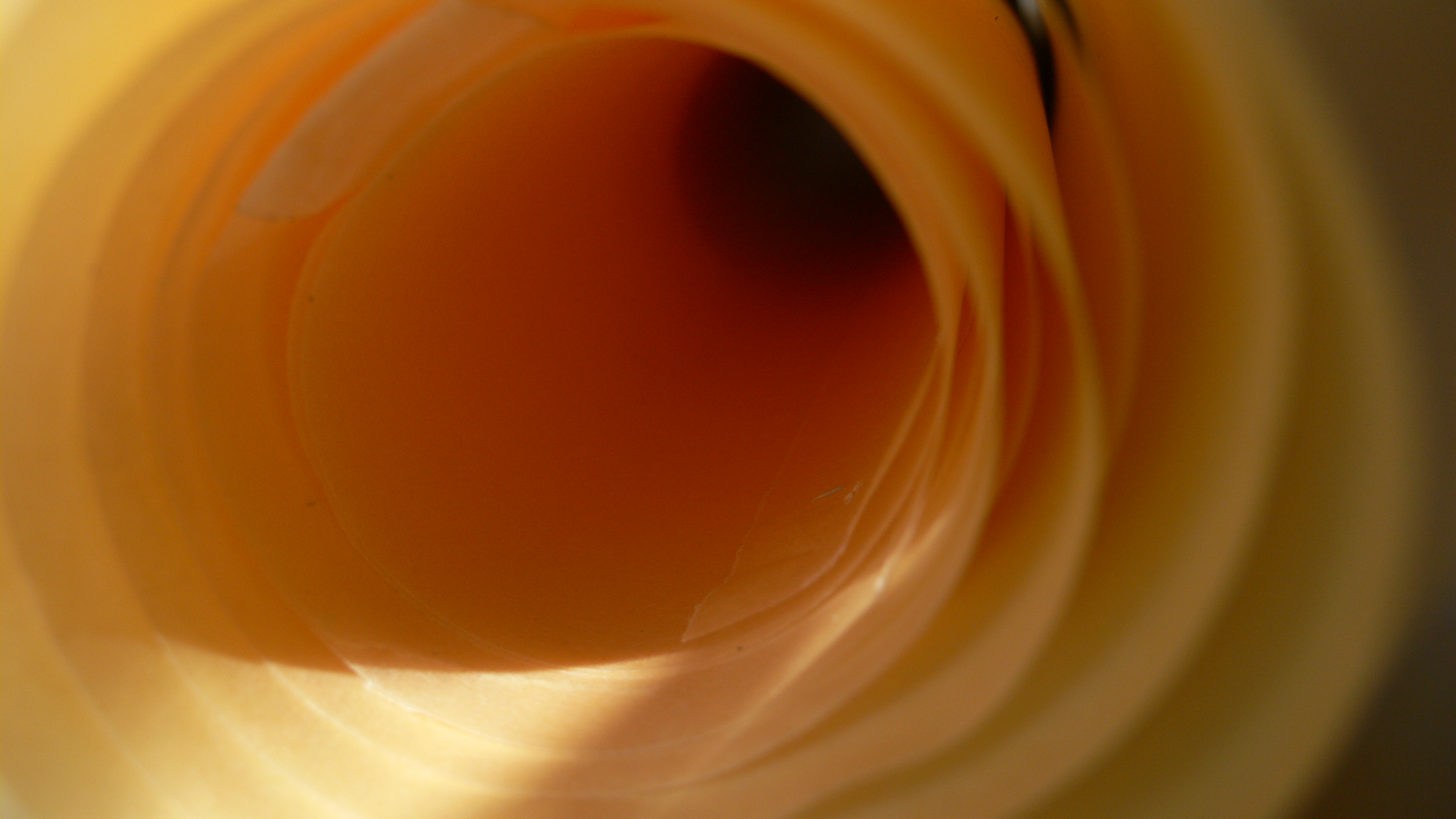
A roll of yellow tracing paper.

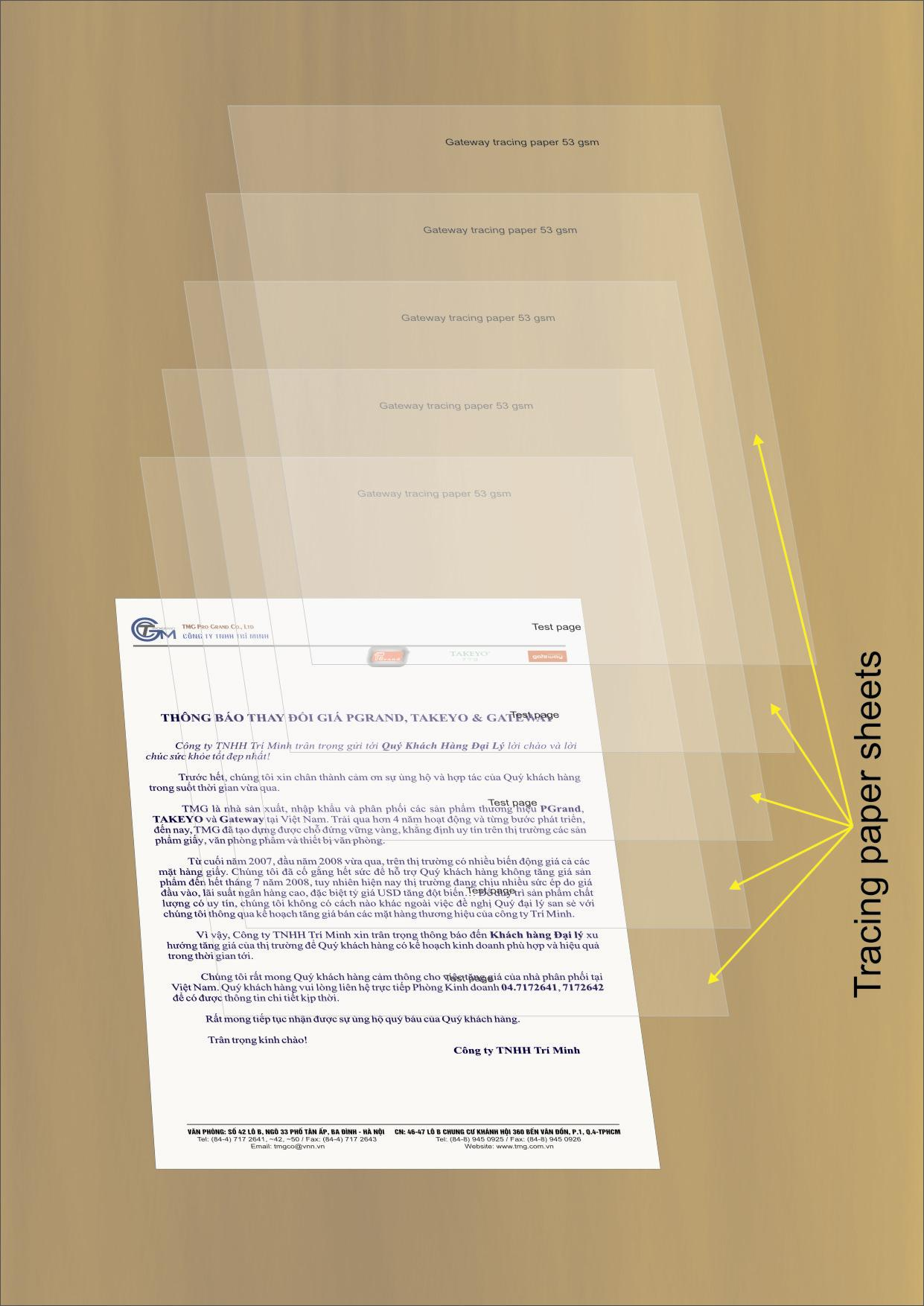
Simulation of tracing paper transformation levels

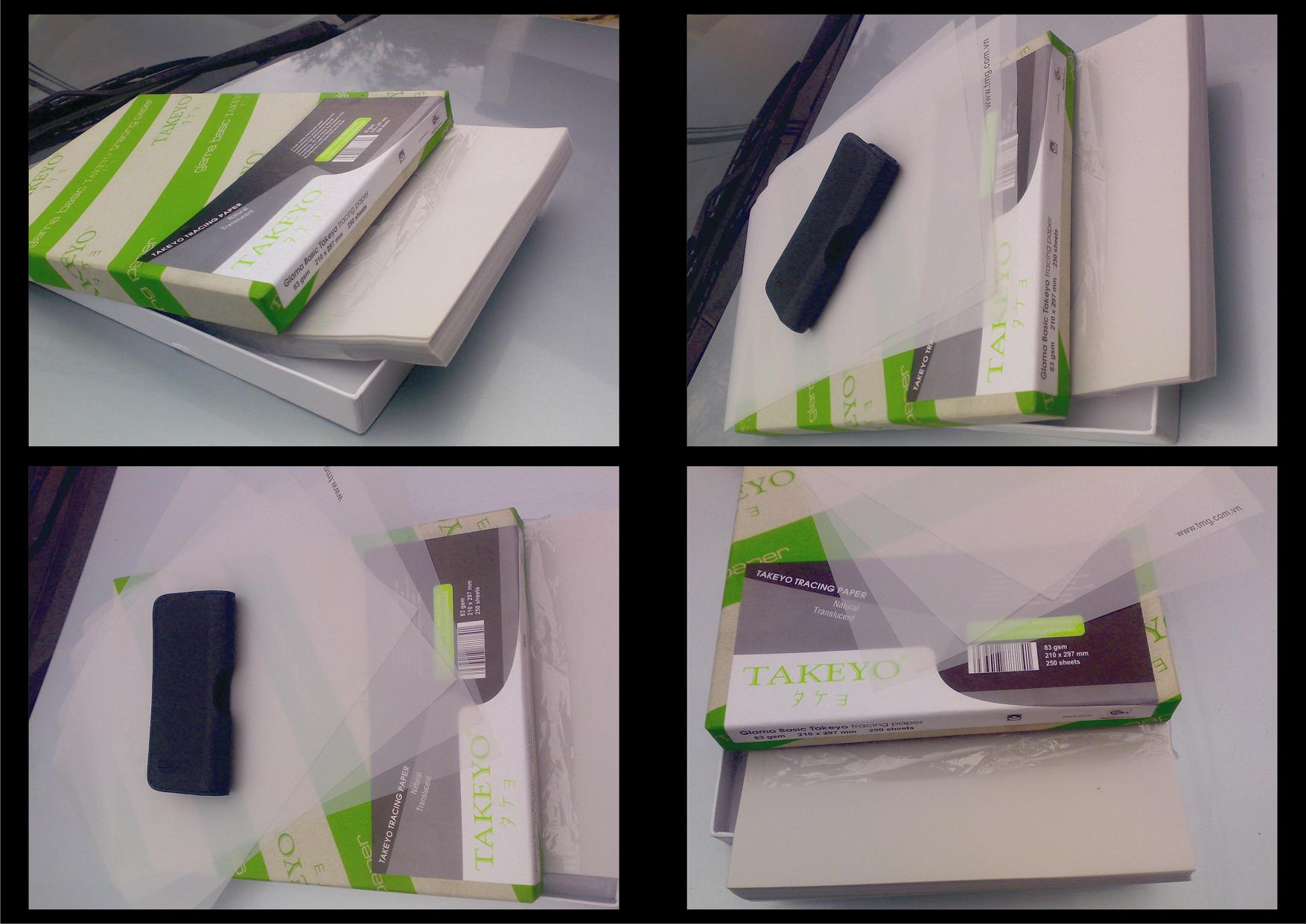
Samples of tracing paper

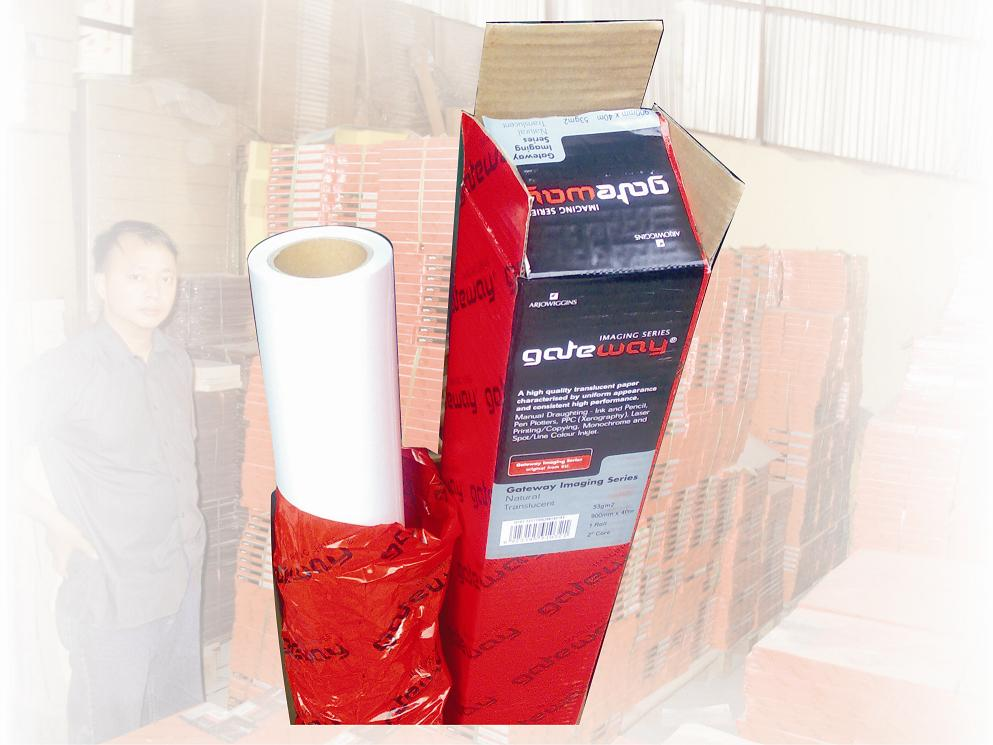
Tracing paper roll

Tracing paper is paper made to have low opacity, allowing light to pass through. Its origins date back to at least the 1300s, when it was used by artists of the Italian Renaissance. In the 1880s, tracing paper was produced en masse, used by architects, design engineers, and artists. Tracing paper was key in creating drawings that could be copied precisely using the diazo copy process. It then found many other uses. The original use for drawing and tracing was largely superseded by technologies that do not require diazo copying or manual copying (by tracing) of drawings.

The transparency of tracing paper is achieved by careful selection of the raw materials and the process used to create transparency. Cellulose fibre forms the basis of the paper, usually from wood species but also from cotton fibre. Often, paper contains other filler materials to enhance opacity and print quality. For tracing or translucent paper, it is necessary to remove any material which obstructs the transmission of light.

== Description ==
Tracing paper is paper made to have low opacity, allowing light to pass through. It is named as such for its ability for an image to be traced onto it. The modern version of tracing paper was developed for architects and design engineers to create drawings which could be copied precisely using the diazo copy process.

When tracing paper is placed onto a picture, the picture is easily visible through the paper. Thus, it becomes easy to find edges in the picture and trace the image onto the tracing paper. Pure cellulose fiber is translucent, and it is the air trapped between fibers that makes paper opaque and look white. If the fibers are refined and beaten until all the air is taken out, then the resulting sheet will be translucent. Translucent papers are dense and contain up to 10% moisture at 50% humidity.

== Production ==
Tracing paper is usually made from sulfite pulp by reducing the fibres to a state of fine subdivision and hydrolysing them by very prolonged beating in water.

There are three main processes to manufacture this type of paper, as follows:

1. Through mechanical 'refining' of the cellulose fibre to create a fibre which is highly fibrillated and gelatinous, so that in forming the sheet of paper, virtually all air is excluded from the internal structure of the paper. This method produces a very translucent and even looking paper over a range of areal densities from 42 to over 280 g/m^{2}.
2. By making a 'normal' sheet of paper and then filling the spaces between the fibres with a material that has the same refractive index as the cellulose. This was a common process adopted in the USA. The product was frequently called Vellum, although this terminology can refer to a wider range of special papers. Due to the relatively high cost, this method of manufacture has largely disappeared.
3. As with 2, by making a normal sheet of paper, which is followed by immersing uncut and unloaded paper of good quality in sulfuric acid for a few seconds. The acid converts some of the cellulose into amyloid form having a gelatinous and impermeable character. When the treated paper is thoroughly washed and dried, the resultant product is much stronger than the original paper. Tracing paper is resistant to oil, grease and to a large extent impervious to water and gas.

The sizing in production will determine whether it is for laser printer or inkjet/offset printing.

Tracing paper may be uncoated or coated. Natural tracing paper for laser printing is usually uncoated.

The HS code for tracing paper is 4806.30.

Tracing paper can be recycled and also can be made from up to 30% recycled fibre.

== Technical specifications ==
- Specifications of natural tracing paper:
  - Smooth surface
  - Non-ageing
  - Acid-free
  - Recyclable

The following are common standards for tracing paper though generally it is manufactured in densities over 60 g/m^{2}:

| Substance | Density | Humidity | Roughness | Translucent | Tensile strength (mD) | Surface alkali pH |
| ISO 536 (g/m^{2}) | (kg/m^{3}) | ISO 287 (%) | ISO 8791-2 (ml/min) | ISO 2469 (%) | ISO 1974 (mN) | ISO 6588 (pH) |
|---|---|---|---|---|---|---|
| 42 | 1,200÷1,235 | 7 | 100-300 | 79 ± 5 | 220–440 | 6-7 |
| 53 | 1,200÷1,235 | 7 | 100-300 | 77 ± 5 | 220–440 | 6-7 |
| 63 | 1,220÷1,250 | 7 | 100-300 | 75 ± 5 | 220–440 | 6-7 |
| 73 | 1,220÷1,250 | 7.5 | 100-300 | 75 ± 5 | 220–440 | 6-7 |
| 83 | 1,220÷1,250 | 7.5 | 100-300 | 75 ± 5 | 220–440 | 6-7 |
| 93 | 1,220÷1,250 | 7.5 | 100-300 | 75 ± 5 | 220–440 | 6-7 |
| 100 | 1,220÷1,250 | 7.5 | 100-300 | 75 ± 5 | 220–440 | 6-7 |
| 112 | 1,220÷1,250 | 8 | 100-300 | 73 ± 5 | 220–440 | 6-7 |
| 130 | 1,220÷1,250 | 8 | 100-300 | 69 ± 5 | 220–440 | 6-7 |
| 150 | 1,220÷1,250 | 8 | 100-300 | 65 ± 5 | 220–440 | 6-7 |
| 160 | 1,220÷1,250 | 8 | 100-300 | 61 ± 5 | 220–440 | 6-7 |
| 170 | 1,220÷1,250 | 8 | 100-300 | 59 ± 5 | 220–440 | 6-7 |
| 190 | 1,220÷1,250 | 8 | 100-300 | 55 ± 5 | 220–440 | 6-7 |
| 200 | 1,220÷1,250 | 8 | 100-300 | 53 ± 5 | 220–440 | 6-7 |
| 240 | 1,220÷1,250 | 8 | 100-300 | 47 ± 5 | 220–440 | 6-7 |
| 280 | 1,220÷1,250 | 8 | 100-300 | 45 ± 5 | 220–440 | 6-7 |

== Application ==
- Traditional printing methods: letterpress, planographic / offset, silk-screen printing
- Laser and inkjet printing
- Processing: varnishing, laminating, punching, embossing, folding, scoring
- Drawing: ink, Indian ink, graphite, pencils
- Photographic and cinema lighting: diffusion filter for light sources to produce aesthetic effect

=== End products ===
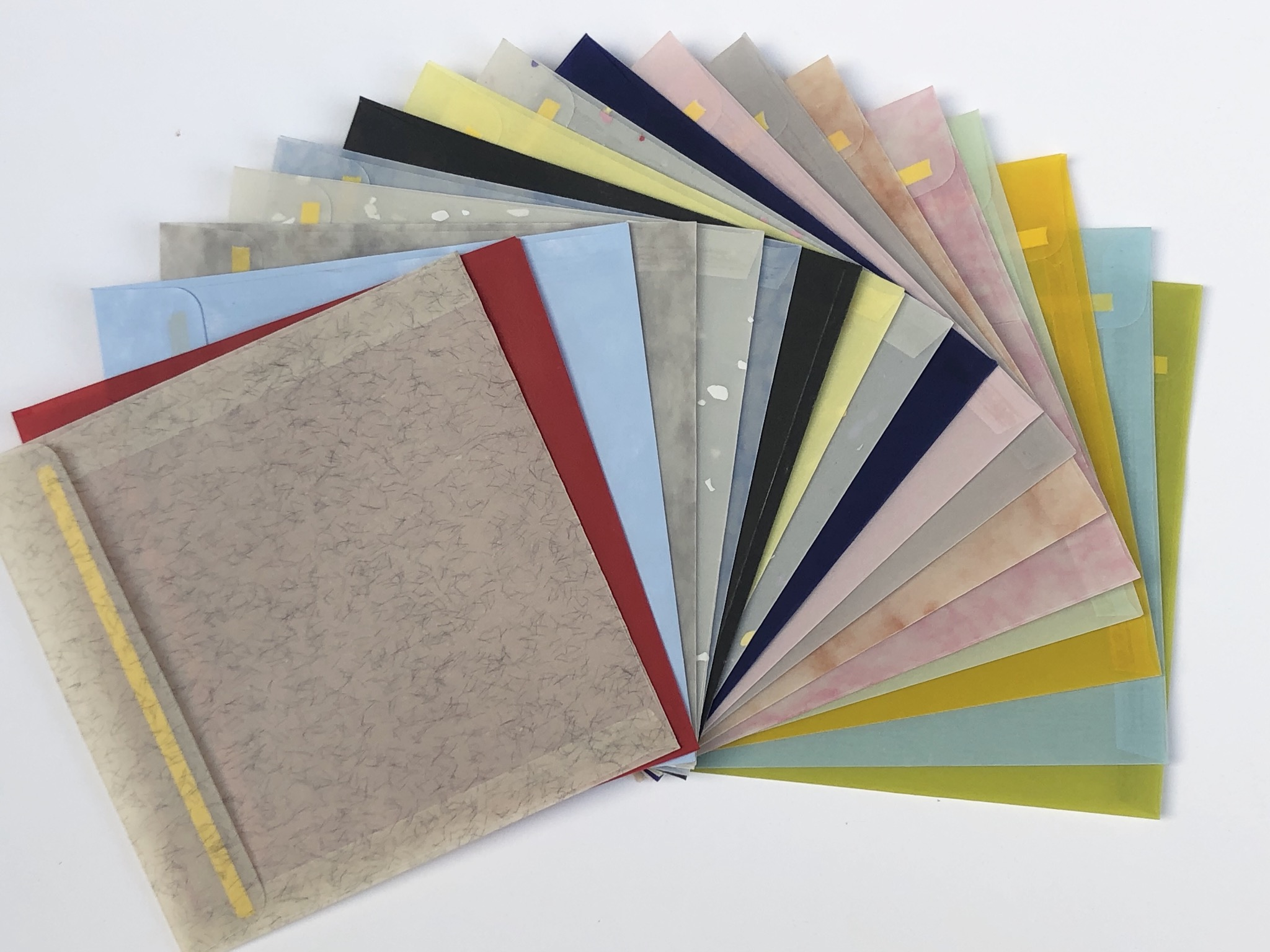
Invitation square envelopes

- Envelopes
- Mailings
- Flyer
- Coversheets
- Album cover dividers
- Business cards
- Greeting cards
- Posters
- Origami

== See also ==
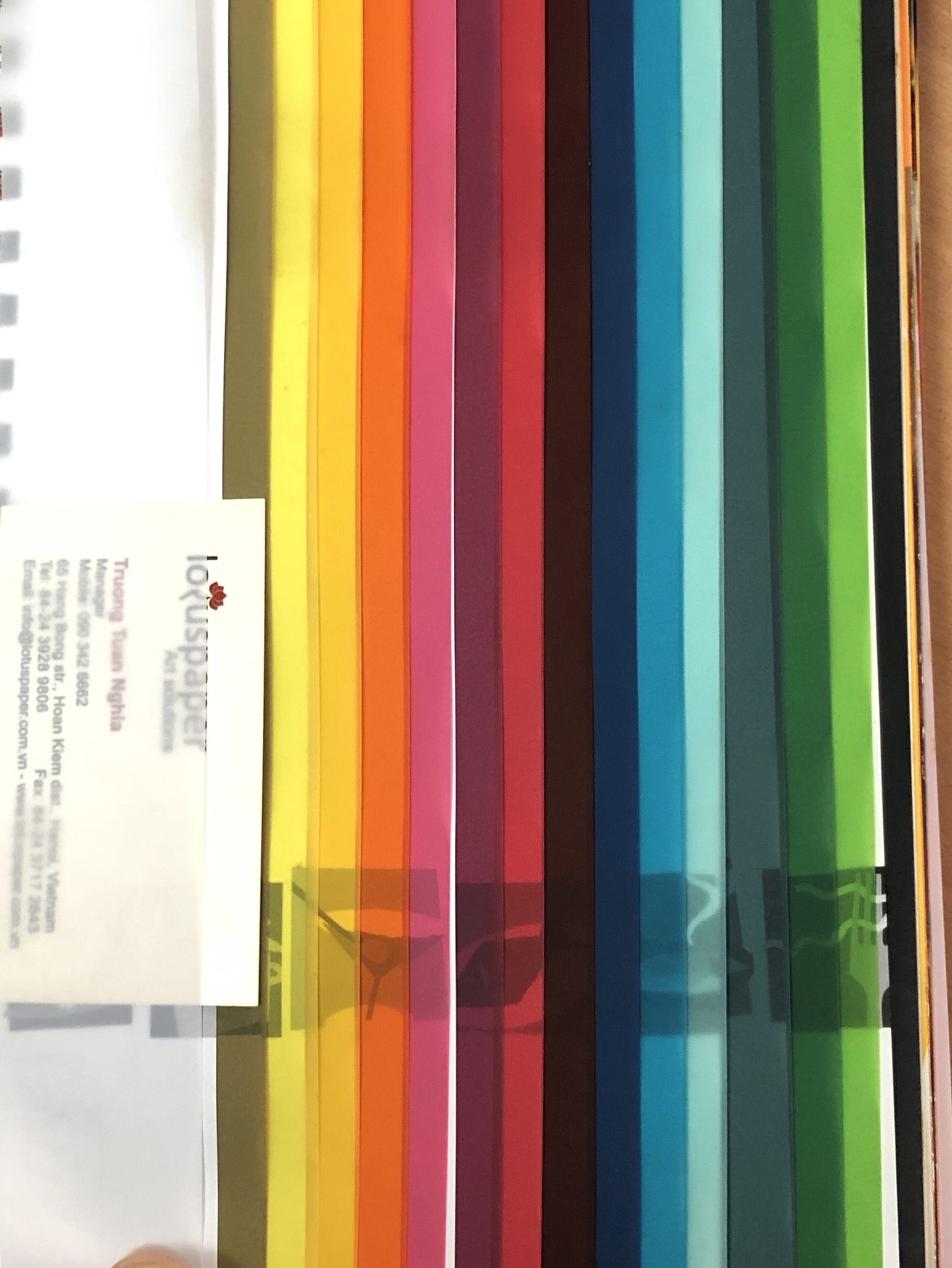
Schoellershammer multi color tracing paper

- Inkjet paper
- Colour tracing paper: Tracing paper also can be solid or marble coloured. In modern times, colour tracing paper is normally used for decoratively for special printing purposes such as for brochures, menus, and invitations
- Parchment paper
- Wax paper
- Glassine paper
- Red rosin paper
- Tracing (art)
