= Balcom =

Balcom is a surname. Notable people with the surname include:

- Bruce Balcom, Canadian scientist
- Eric Balcom (1910–1989), businessman and political figure in Nova Scotia, Canada
- Henry Balcom (1804–1882), shipbuilder and political figure in Nova Scotia
- Homer G. Balcom (1870–1938), American structural engineer
- Lannie Balcom (1941–1991), stage name for Linda K. Balcom, an American model, actress and Playboy Playmate of the Month
- Samuel Rosborough Balcom (1888–1981), Canadian politician, businessman and pharmacist

== See also ==
- Balcom and Vaughan Pipe Organ, Inc., a builder of pipe organs based in Seattle
