= Fu Hua Chen =

Chinese engineer

Fu Hua Chen (July 21, 1912 – March 4, 1999) was a Chinese engineer who was a pioneer of soil engineering. Born in Fu Zhou, Fu Jain, China, he was the chief engineer of the Burma Road. He arrived in the United States in 1957 where he set up his own firm. Countless structures from single dwellings to skyscrapers, from long-span bridges to dams rest firmly on foundation systems designed in accordance with requirements set forth by Chen.

== See also ==
- Engineering Legends
- Fazlur Khan
- Tung-Yen Lin
- Hal Iyengar
