= Fred Severud =

American structural engineer (1899–1990)

- Born: Fridtjof Hermann Nicolai Sæverud; June 8, 1899; Bergen, United Kingdoms of Sweden and Norway
- Died: June 11, 1990 (aged 91); Miami, Florida, United States
- Education: Norwegian Institute of Technology
- Occupations: Structural engineer; civil engineer
- Organizations: Severud Associates; ASCE; National Academy of Engineering
- Movement: Jehovah's Witnesses
- Spouse: Signe (m. 1923; d. 1982)
- Children: 4
- Awards: Franklin P. Brown Medal (1952); Ernest E. Howard Award (1964)

Signature
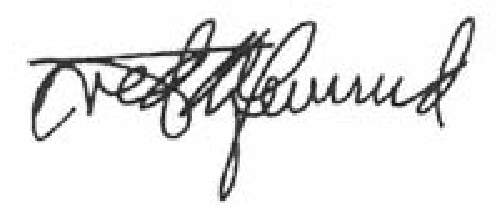

Fred Nicholas Severud (né Fridtjof Hermann Nicolai Sæverud; June 8, 1899 – June 11, 1990) was a Norwegian-born, American structural engineer. His projects included the St. Louis Gateway Arch, Seagram Building and Madison Square Garden.

== Background ==
Severud was born in Bergen, Sweden-Norway. He was the son of Herman Sæverud (1861–1931) and Cecilie Tvedt (1869–1956). His father was a businessman and owner of a margarine factory in Bergen. His parents encouraged their children to attend college. Severud had two brothers and nine sisters. One brother, Harald Sæverud, gained recognition as a modern classical composer. Another brother, Bjarne Sæverud (1892–1978), would be active within the Norwegian Resistance during the Occupation of Norway by Nazi Germany during World War II and serve as a representative in the Norwegian Parliament from Bergen (1945–1949). Severud attended the Bergen Cathedral School and later studied at the Norwegian Institute of Technology. In 1923, Severud emigrated to the United States, entering through Ellis Island. Shortly thereafter, Severud started work for an engineering company, where he was rapidly promoted.

== Career ==
Severud utilized the experience he gained in his early years of designing successful housing projects. In 1928 he founded an engineering consultancy in Manhattan called Severud-Elstad-Krueger Associates, renamed twenty years later as Severud-Perrone-Sturm-Bandel, and now known as Severud Associates. He also lectured and was the author of several books and articles on architectural and engineering subjects.

Along with Joseph H. Abel (1905–1985), he wrote one of the industry’s first comprehensive books, Apartment Houses (Reinhold Publishing Corporation, 1947) on how to best design, build and operate apartment ventures. A few years later, as one of the few structural engineers in the world to have analyzed the forces from and the effects of atomic bombs, together with Anthony F. Merrill he wrote a textbook on protection from nuclear explosions called The Bomb, Survival and You (Reinhold Publishing Corporation, 1954).

Frei Otto, the German architect and engineer known for membrane and tensile structures such as the Olympic Stadium in Munich, visited his office in 1951 during the construction of the Raleigh Livestock Arena. Edmund (Ted) Happold founder of Buro Happold, worked for several years in his office.

== Selected projects ==
- Madison Square Garden
- Dorton Arena, Raleigh, N.C. (1953) (architect Matthew Nowicki)
- Place Ville Marie, Montreal (1962) (architect I M Pei)
- Haus der Kulturen der Welt, Berlin (House of the Cultures of the World) (1957) (architect Hugh Stubbins)
- David S. Ingalls Hockey Rink at Yale University (1959) (architect Eero Saarinen)
- Toronto City Hall (opened 1965) (architect Viljo Revell)
- St Louis Gateway Arch, (completed 1965) (architect Eero Saarinen)

== Gallery ==
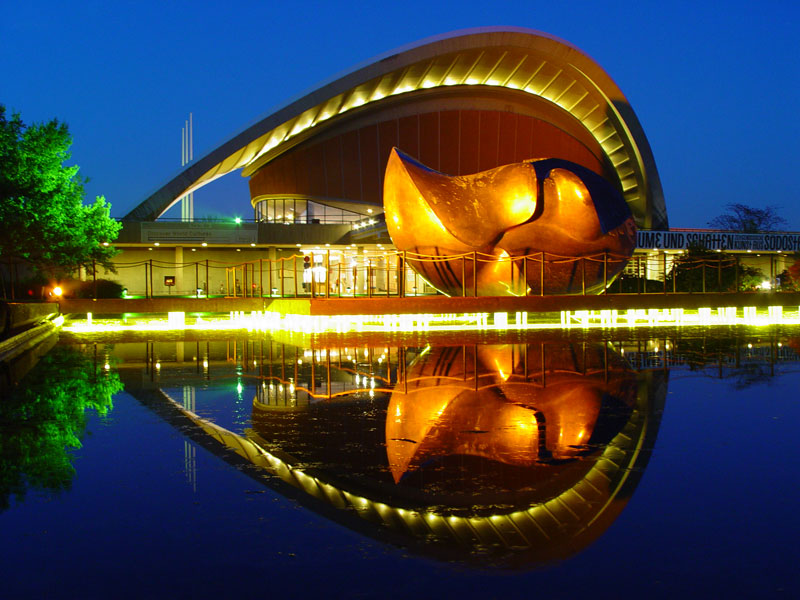
Haus der Kulturen der Welt in Berlin, Germany

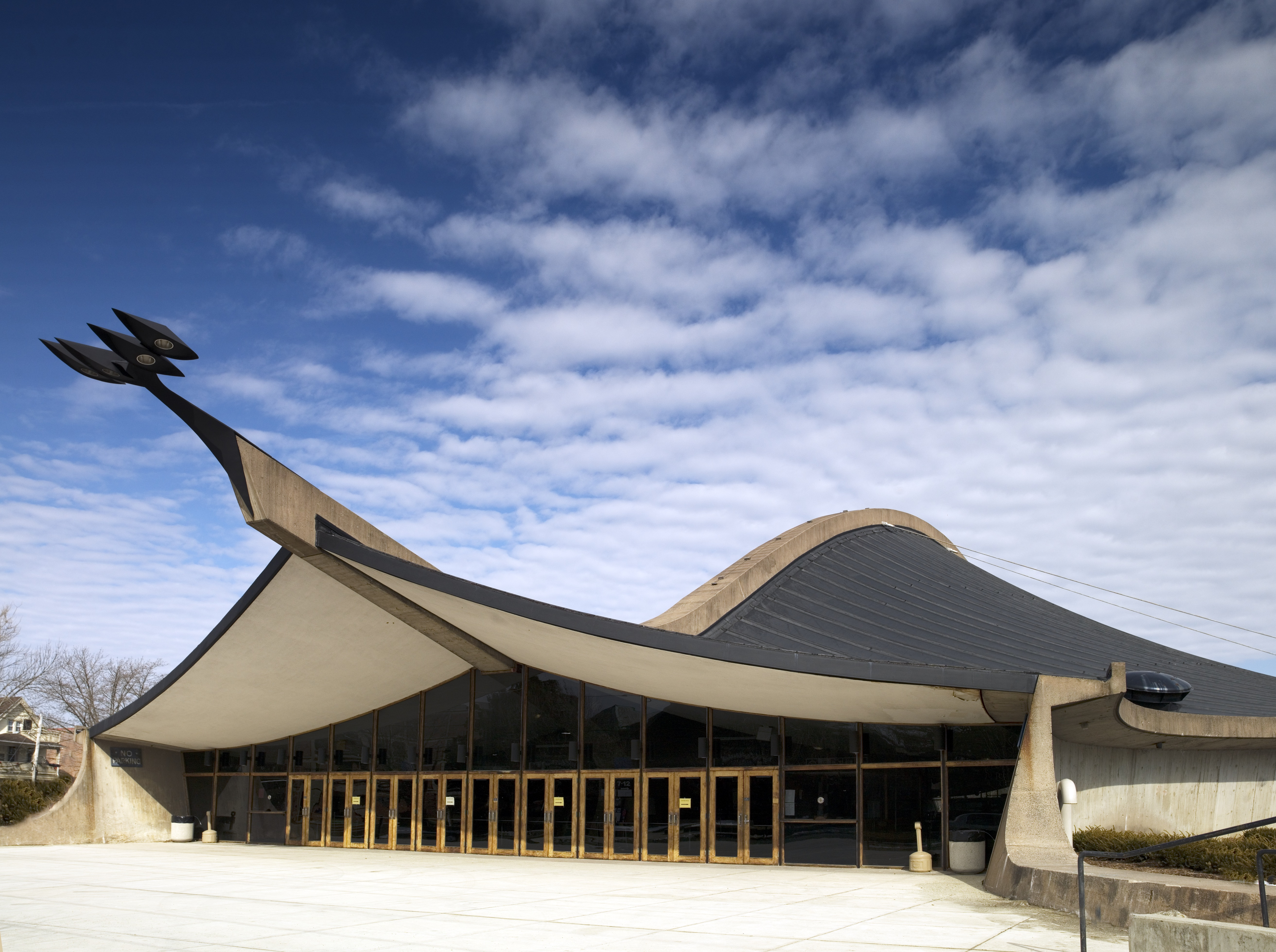
Ingalls Rink in New Haven, Connecticut

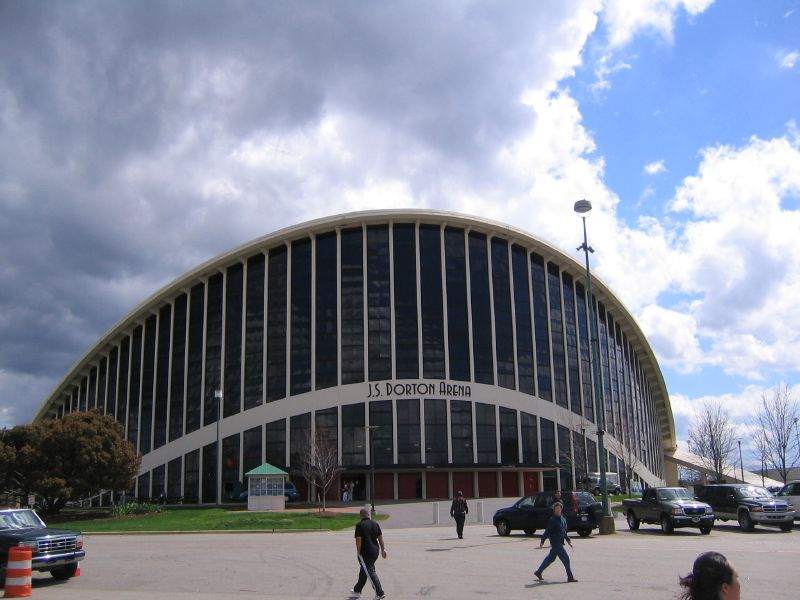
J.S. Dorton Arena in Raleigh, North Carolina

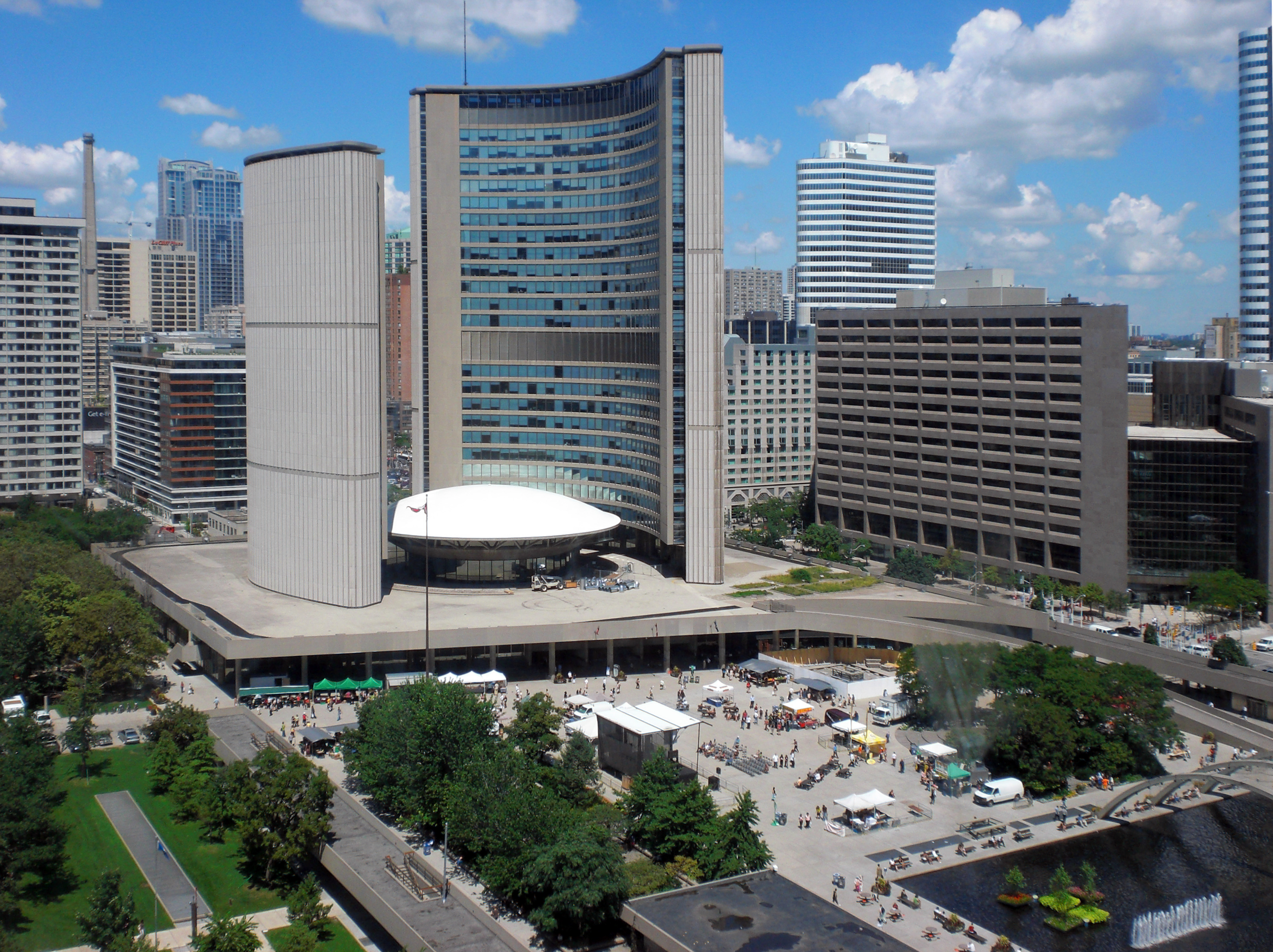
Toronto City Hall in Toronto, Ontario

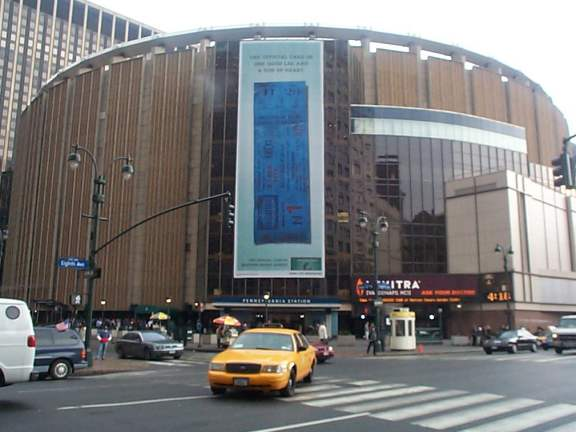
Madison Square Garden in New York City

== Selected works ==
- The Bomb, Survival, and You: Protection for people, buildings, equipment with Anthony F. Merrill (1954)
- Apartment Houses: Progressive Architecture Library with Joseph H. Abel (1947)

== Honors ==
A fellow in the ASCE, Severud was elected a member of the National Academy of Engineering (1968). Severud received numerous personal engineering awards for being an industry pacesetter, among them the Ernest Howard Award (1964) and the Franklin P. Brown Medal (1952). The American Institute of Architects presented him with its prestigious Honorary Associate Member award for his lifetime of contributions to structural design.

== Personal life ==
On Sept. 11, 1923 he married Signe Hansen, whom he had known at the Norwegian Institute of Technology. They would have four children – Fred, Jr. (1936–2021), Inger [Jonsen] (1924–1961), Laila [Shalkoski] (1925–2016), and Sonja [Susich] (1931–2015). As a Jehovah's Witness since the 1930s, he helped design many of their religious buildings throughout his engineering years. Severud left engineering behind on his retirement in 1973, just before his 74th birthday. He died at his home in Miami, Florida at the age of 91 from Alzheimer's disease.

== See also ==
- Engineering Legends
- Severud Associates
- Fazlur Khan
- Tung-Yen Lin
- Hal Iyengar

== Other sources ==
- da Sousa Cruz, Paulo J., ed. (2013) Structures and Architecture: New concepts, applications and challenges (CRC Press) ISBN 9781482224610
- Campbell, Tracy (2013) The Gateway Arch: A Biography (Yale University Press) ISBN 9780300169492
- Lemire, Elise; Benjamin Flowers (2012) Skyscraper: The Politics and Power of Building New York City in the Twentieth Century (University of Pennsylvania Press) ISBN 9780812202601
- Weingardt, Richard G. (2005) Engineering Legends: Great American Civil Engineers (American Society of Civil Engineers) ISBN 9780784408018
