= Eventi =

Hotel in Manhattan, New York

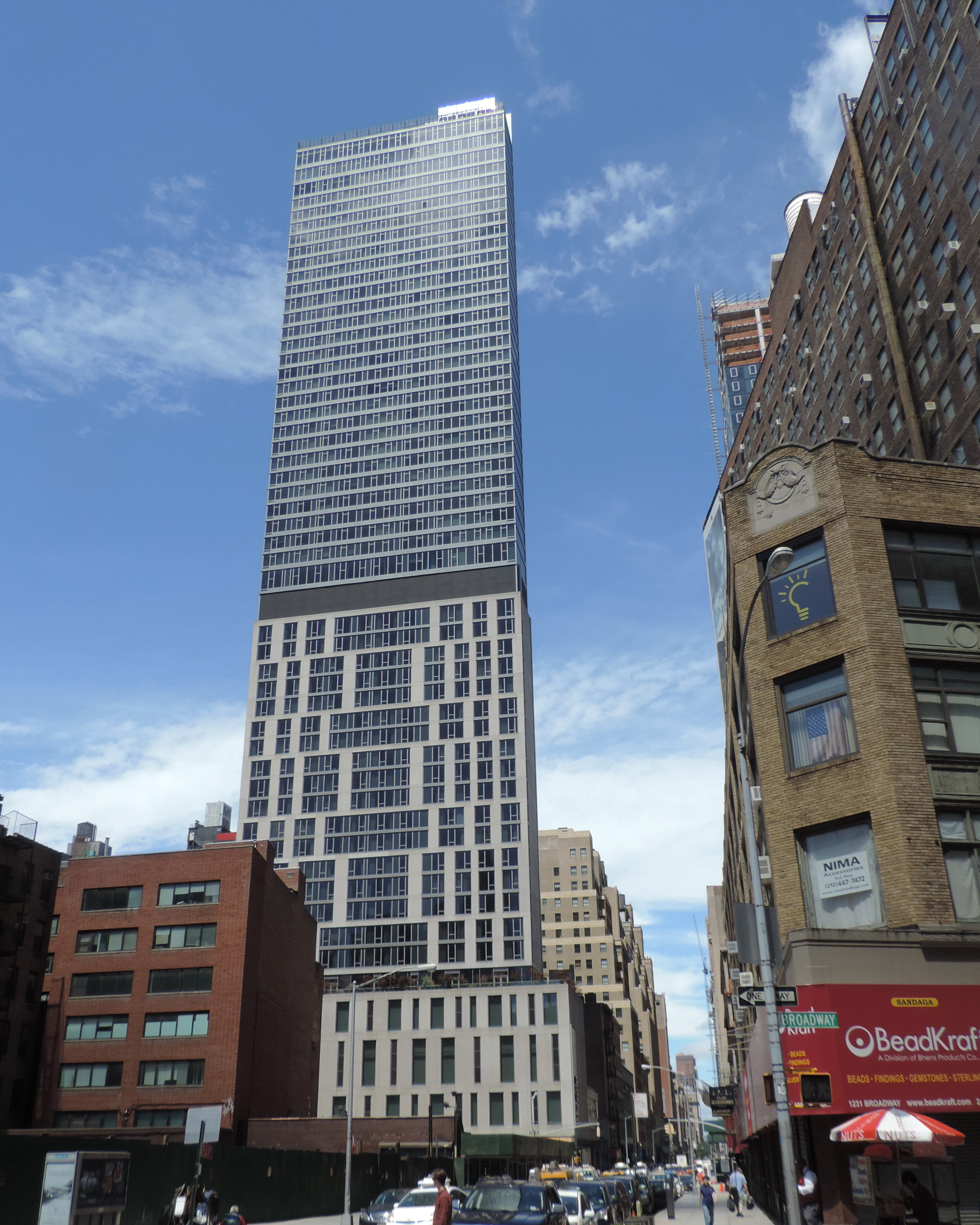

- Location within New York City

General information
- Status: Completed
- Type: Hotels, Residential
- Location: 851 6th Avenue; New York City, New York, United States
- Coordinates: 40°44′50″N 73°59′25″W
- Construction started: 2006
- Completed: 2010
- Opening: 2010

Height
- Roof: 187.1 meters (614 ft)

Technical details
- Floor count: 46

Design and construction
- Architects: Perkins Eastman coordinating architect SBLM Architects
- Developer: Carlisle Development Corporation
- Structural engineer: Severud Associates
- Main contractor: M. D. Carlisle Construction Corporation

Eventi is a hotel and residential skyscraper located on Sixth Avenue and West 30th Street in Chelsea, Manhattan, New York City, near Herald Square.

== See also ==
- List of tallest buildings in New York City
