= Balcon =

Balcon is a surname. Notable people with the surname include:

- Isabella Dal Balcon (born 1977), Italian snowboarder
- Jill Balcon (1925–2009), English actress
- Michael Balcon (1896–1977), English film producer

== See also ==
- Balcom
