= Homer G. Balcom =

American civil engineer

- Born: Homer Gage Balcom; February 16, 1870; Chili, New York
- Died: July 3, 1938 (aged 68); New York City
- Burial place: Sleepy Hollow Cemetery
- Education: Cornell University
- Spouse: Gertrude McCrum (m. 1900)
- Children: 1
- Engineering career
- Projects: Empire State Building

Homer Gage Balcom (February 16, 1870 – July 3, 1938) was an American structural engineer who was responsible for designing the Empire State Building. Richard Weingardt dubbed him "the most prominent consulting structural engineer in America after World War I".

== Life and career ==
Balcom was born on February 16, 1870, in Chili, New York, the only child of Mahlon and Francis (née Gage) Balcom. He earned his degree in civil engineering in 1897 from Cornell University.

Balcom married Gertrude McCrum in 1900. They had one daughter, Gertrude Marie. She often accompanied her father to engineering and social functions.

During World War I he volunteered to engineer steel ships for U.S. government at the Hog Island, Pennsylvania shipyards. Because of his contributions, 122 military vessels were built for the war effort at Hog Island, the most of any shipyard by a wide margin.

Although most of his notable works are in the US, he also designed buildings outside of the US. Examples include the Louvain University Library in Belgium, Devonshire House in London and YMCA's building in Jerusalem.

Balcom died on July 3, 1938, at age 68. He had checked into French Hospital four days earlier for a heart ailment. Masonic funeral services were held at his residence, 65 Calumet Avenue, Hasting-on-Hudson, and afterward he was buried at Sleepy Hollow Cemetery.

== Legacy ==
In 1996, the ASCE Metropolitan Section (ASCE/Metro) established the Homer Gage Balcom Award: "To be presented to an individual who has demonstrated a lifetime of excellence in the structural engineering of buildings, along with advances in the state-of-the-art and a commitment to the advancement of the structural engineering profession."

== List of buildings ==
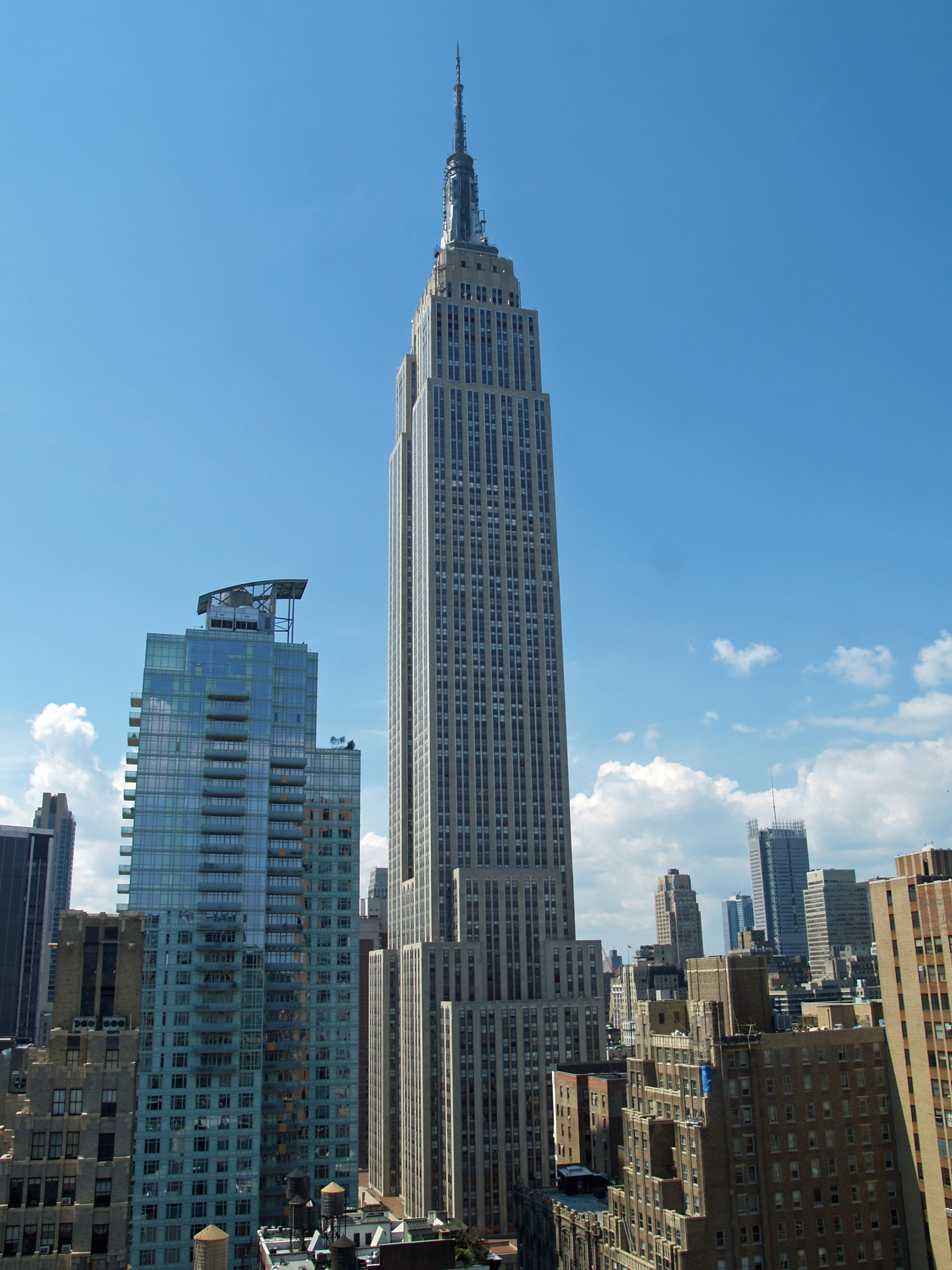
The Empire state Building

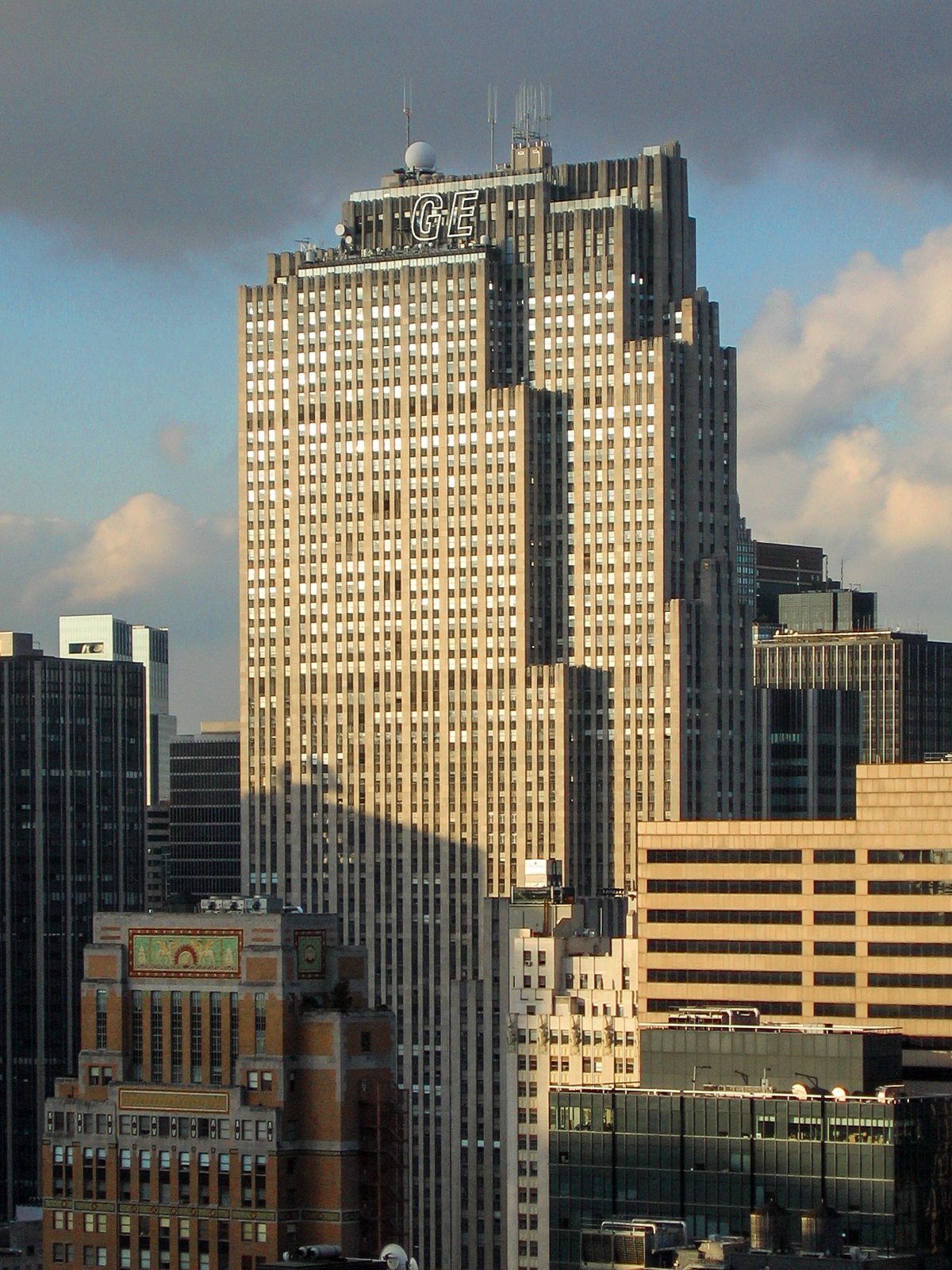
GE Building

- Empire State Building
- David McCullough Bridge
- Rockefeller Center Plaza
- GE Building
- Waldorf-Astoria Hotel
- Nebraska State Capitol

== See also ==
- Engineering Legends
- Fazlur Rahman Khan
