= Severud Associates =

American structural engineering firm

Severud Associates Consulting Engineers P.C.
- Company type: Privately held
- Industry: Structural Engineering
- Founded: 1928
- Founder: Fred N. Severud
- Headquarters: New York City
- Number of locations: New York City, London, Paris
- Owner: Edward DePaola, John Baranello, Cawsie Jijina, Steven Najarian, Brian A. Falconer
- Number of employees: ~75
- Website: www.severud.com

Severud is a multinational structural engineering consulting firm headquartered in New York City, with additional offices in London and Paris. The firm has worked on over 12,000 projects around the world.

== History ==
Severud was founded in the year 1928 by Fred Severud, a Norwegian-born American structural engineer and member of the National Academy of Engineering. Originally the firm was called Severud-Elstad-Krueger Associates, then renamed Severud-Perrone-Sturm-Bandel, and finally shortened to Severud Associates.

The company has designed numerous notable structures in their early history. These include Place Ville Marie (1962), Arecibo Observatory (1963), the St. Louis Gateway Arch (1965), Madison Square Garden (1968), IDS Center (1973), and AXA Center (1985). Recently, Severud has been the structural engineer for the National Museum of the American Indian, Thomson Reuters Building (2001), the Bank of America Tower at One Bryant Park (2009), Eventi (2010), the Claire Tow Theater at Lincoln Center (2012)., One Vanderbilt, 270 Park Avenue (2025), and the MSG Sphere at The Venetian in Las Vegas.
