= Chili, New York =

- Town
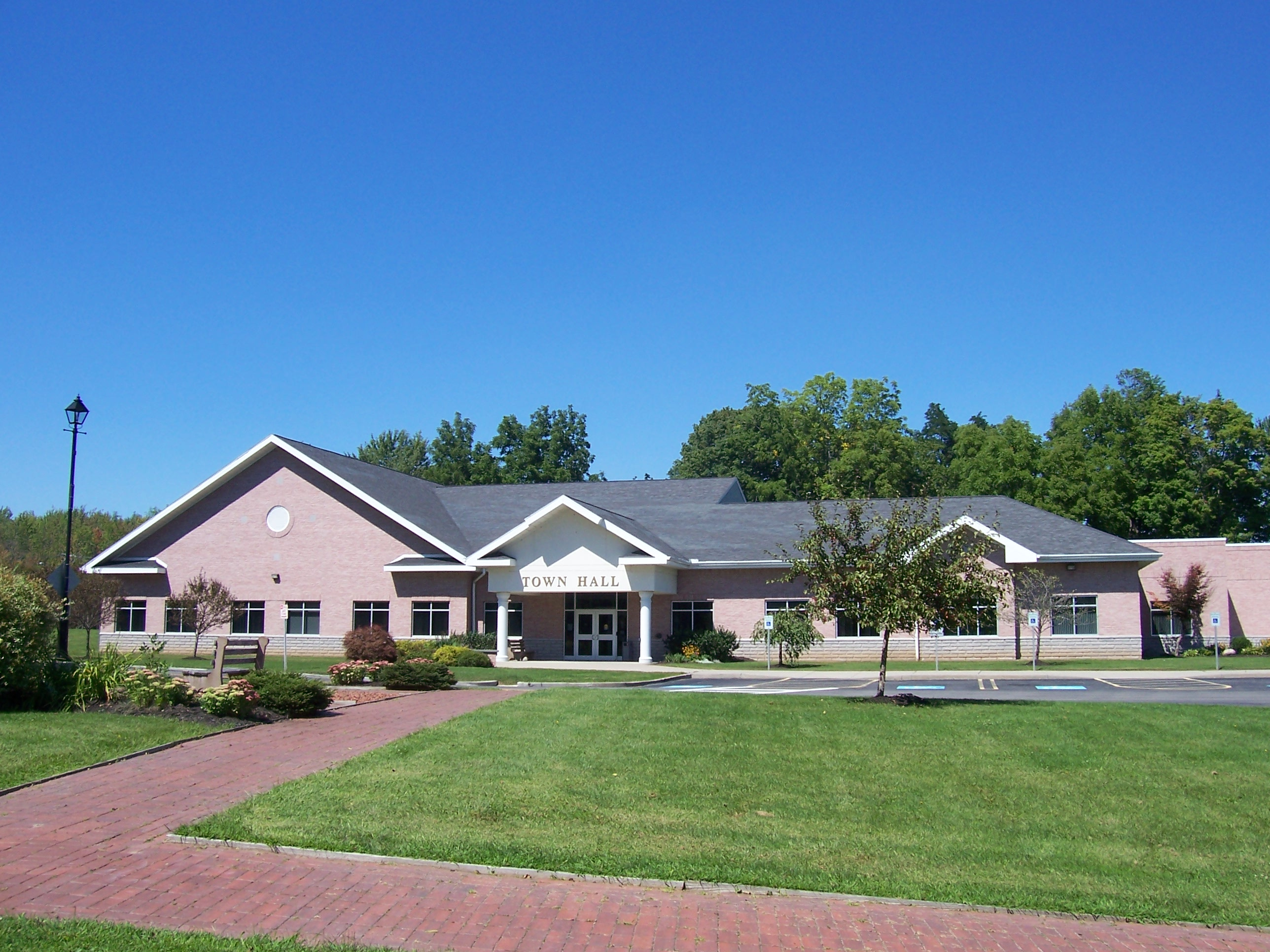
- Chili town hall

- Location in Monroe County and the state of New York.

- Location of New York in the United States
- Coordinates: 43°06′14″N 77°45′10″W
- Country: United States
- State: New York
- County: Monroe
- Established: February 22, 1822; 204 years ago

Government
  - Type: Council government
  - Town supervisor: David Dunning (R) Town council: Mark Decory (R); James Valerio (R); Michael S. Slattery (R); Tracy DiFlorio (R)

Area
  - Total: 39.85 sq mi (103.2 km^{2})
  - Land: 39.50 sq mi (102.3 km^{2})
  - Water: 0.35 sq mi (0.91 km^{2})
- Elevation: 556 ft (169 m)

Population (2020)
  - Total: 29,123
  - Density: 729.0/sq mi (281.47/km^{2})
- Time zone: UTC-5 (EST)
  - Summer (DST): UTC-4 (EDT)
- ZIP Codes: 14428 (Churchville); 14514 (North Chili); 14546 (Scottsville); 14623-14624 (Rochester)
- Area code: 585
- FIPS code: 36-055-15462
- Website: www.chiliny.gov

Chili (/ˈtʃaɪlaɪ/ CHY-ly) is a town in Monroe County, New York, United States. The population was 29,123 at the 2020 census. It is a suburb of the city of Rochester, established in 1822 from part of the town of Riga. North Chili was a stop on the Underground Railroad. Black Creek Park is one of many parks in Chili where visitors can make use of nature trails that run along the creek.

== History ==
The Chili area was once the hunting ground of the Seneca people. The first white settler was Captain Joseph Morgan, who purchased land from Peter Sheffer of neighboring Wheatland.

The area of Chili became part of the newly formed town of Northampton. With the formation of Monroe County the area became part of the town of Riga before splitting off into its own town on February 22, 1822.

Chili's etymology is disputed. Two popular theories are that it was named after the country of Chile, which was striving for independence at the time, or after the Chiliast faith embraced by some of the early settlers of South Chili.

The Chili Mills Conservation Area was listed on the National Register of Historic Places in 1975.

== Geography ==
Chili is in southwestern Monroe County and is bordered at its northeastern corner by the city of Rochester. The town is bordered to the north by the towns of Gates and Ogden, to the west by the town of Riga, to the east by the town of Henrietta, and to the south by the town of Wheatland. Downtown Rochester is 7 miles (11 km) northeast of the hamlet of Chili Center.

According to the U.S. Census Bureau, the town of Chili has a total area of 39.9 square miles (103 km^{2}), of which 39.5 square miles (102 km^{2}) are land and 0.4 square miles (1.0 km^{2}), or 0.89%, are water. Both Interstate 490 and the New York State Thruway (Interstate 90) pass through Chili.

== Demographics ==
Historical population
Census	Pop.	Note	%±
1830	2,010		—
1840	2,174		8.2%
1850	2,247		3.4%
1860	2,205		−1.9%
1870	2,367		7.3%
1880	2,274		−3.9%
1890	2,109		−7.3%
1900	2,099		−0.5%
1910	2,071		−1.3%
1920	1,780		−14.1%
1930	2,493		40.1%
1940	3,392		36.1%
1950	5,283		55.7%
1960	11,237		112.7%
1970	19,609		74.5%
1980	23,676		20.7%
1990	25,178		6.3%
2000	27,638		9.8%
2010	28,625		3.6%
2020	29,123		1.7%
U.S. Decennial Census

As of the census of 2020, there were 29,123 people residing in the town. The population density was 737 inhabitants per square mile (285/km2).

According to the U.S. Census Bureau's 2020–2024 American Community Survey 5-year estimates, the racial makeup of the town was 79.0% White, 8.7% African American, 0.0% Native American, 1.9% Asian, 0.0% Pacific Islander, 2.4% from other races, and 7.9% from two or more races. Hispanic or Latino of any race were 6.2% of the population.

There were 11,883 households. In the town, 20.4% of residents were under the age of 18, and 19.0% were 65 years of age or older. The median age was 42.9 years. For every 100 females, there were 96.2 males.

The median income for a household in the town was $89,793, and the per capita income for the town was $44,593. About 7.1% of the population were below the poverty line.

== Education ==
Chili is served by the Churchville-Chili Central School District, Gates Chili Central School District, and Wheatland–Chili Central School District.

== Government ==
The town is governed by a town board consisting of a supervisor and four board members, all elected by registered town voters.

The local government includes town supervisor David Dunning (R) and town councillors Mark Decory (R); James Valerio (R); Michael S. Slattery (R); and Tracy DiFlorio (R). The appointed deputy town supervisor is Michael S. Slattery.

Supervisors
Name	Tenure	Name	Tenure
Joseph Sibley	1822–1823	Thomas B. Steckel	1952–1959
Joshua Howell	1824–1825	George K. Lusk	1960–1965
Alfred Scofield	1826–1828	Samuel S. Kent	1966–1971
Isaac Lacey	1829; 1840	James J. Powers	1972–1985
Benjamin Bowen	1830	Lorraine Anderson	1986–1987
William Pixley	1831–1832; 1836-1837; 1852-1853	John Hannah	1988–1989
George Brown	1833-1834	Donald Ramsey	1990–1991
Moses Sperry	1835; 1838-1839; 1844; 1854	Jerome P. Brixner	1992–1993
John T. Lacey	1841; 1843; 1845-1846	William C. Kelly	1994–1999
Isaac Burritt	1842	Stephen W. Hendershott	2000–2003
William P. Hill	1847-1848; 1861-1864; 1867; 1878 (part year); 1880-1881	Tracy L. Logel	2004–2007
Franklin Cate	1849-1851	David J. Dunning	2008–present
David Starkey	1855–1858		
Edward J. Reed	1859–1860		
A. S. Litle	1865		
Albert H. King	1866; 1871		
William Voke	1868–1870		
Frederick Fellows	1872–1877		
William Fellows	1878 (part year)		
Edwin A. Loder	1879		
Benjamin Fellows	1882–1884		
Byron D. Beal	1885–1886		
Lewis B. Carpenter	1887-1890; 1896-1898		
Myron Sperry	1891		
John B. Johnston	1892–1895		
Arthur A. Sickles	1899–1901		
Cornelius A. Nichols	1902–1907		
Charles G. Voke	1908–1915		
Warren R. Henderson	1916–1929		
W. H. Wickins	1930–1935		
Gage M. Miller	1936–1949		
Oakley Decker	1950–1951		

== Communities and locations ==
- Chili Center – The centre of town government and the most urbanized portion of the town.
- Genesee River – Part of the east border of the town.
- North Chili – A hamlet in the northwest part of the town and home to Roberts Wesleyan College.
- South Chili – A rural area in Chili running along the New York State Thruway. The first business was located here called the Checker Tavern
- West Chili – A small community located just north of Black Creek Park. Originally called Buckbee's Corners.
- East Chili - A small community in the eastern part of the town. This does not exist in present day.
- Clifton- A small rural hamlet in the southern part of the town. Originally called Hardscrabble, it produced a world award-winning type of flour.

== Places of local interest ==
Roberts Wesleyan University is a private, Christian, liberal arts university in North Chili. The school enrolls approximately 2,000 students. The school hosts various community events on its facilities, including soccer games, swimming lessons, dance recitals, fireworks, concerts, drama productions and many other events.

== Notable people ==
- Homer G. Balcom, structural engineer of the Empire State Building; born in Chili in 1870
- Brittanee Drexel, murder victim who disappeared in 2009; lived in Chili with her mother and step-father

== Sister cities ==
- Agropoli - Italy
