= Srinivasa Iyengar (civil engineer) =

Indian American civil engineer (1934–2019)

- Born: May 6, 1934; Mysore, Princely State of Mysore, British India
- Died: July 4, 2019 (aged 85); Fort Myers, Florida, U.S.
- Education: University of Mysore; Indian Institute of Science; University of Illinois
- Engineering career
- Discipline: Civil engineering
- Practice name: Skidmore, Owings & Merrill
- Projects: John Hancock Center; Sears Tower; Anaheim Stadium expansion Soldier Field renovation McCormick Exposition Center

Srinivasa "Hal" Iyengar (6 May 1934 – 4 July 2019) was an Indian American civil engineer and a senior structural consultant, who has been particularly instrumental in the development of innovative and efficient structural concepts and systems for high-rise, long-span and stadium structures.

== Early life and education ==
Iyengar was born in Bangalore, India to a prominent civil engineering family. His father was chief engineer for the Indian state of Mysore in Southern India. In his youth, he traveled with his father to building sites where he found his passion for civil engineering. He graduated from the University of Mysore with a Bachelor's degree in Civil Engineering in 1956. .

Inspired by the american way of life through movies and film, He aspired to move to the United States and continue his graduate studies in engineering at an american university. At that time, Indians were beginning to leave India and enroll at American universities to purse graduate studies in scientific or technical fields. He applied for graduate studies in engineering at several american universities.

He went on to earn a master's degree in hydraulic and civil engineering from the Indian Institute of Science in Bangalore in 1957. Having been accepted in several graduate programs, he moved to the United States that year, and enrolled at the University of Illinois. He earned a master's degree in structural engineering from the University of Illinois in 1959.

== Career ==
In 1960, Iyengar was hired as a structural engineer in the Chicago office of Skidmore, Owings & Merrill. While there, he bonded with structural engineer Fazlur Khan, a fellow alum of the University of Illinois, who Iyengar came to regard as an "inspiration and a good friend." Together, they encouraged the office to get a computer - the IBM 1620 - and developed 60 structural computer programs. He went on to serve as the director of Structural Engineering at Skidmore, Owings & Merrill's Chicago office from 1975 to 1992 and eventually as partner.

Throughout his career, Iyengar has worked with notable architects such as Bruce Graham, Frank Gehry and Walter Netsch. Passionate about his collaborations with architects during a time when structural engineering was modernizing with advances in computer technology, Iyengar considered it "imperative for engineers to evolve with today's new technologies and be able to reinvent themselves through the powerful process of computer visualization."

== Projects ==
Iyengar has been involved in many notable projects such as the John Hancock Center, Sears Tower, the Anaheim Stadium expansion, the Soldier Field renovation, the McCormick Exposition Center in Chicago, the Convention Center in Hong Kong, Broadgate Phase 11, the Hotel Artes in Barcelona, the Guggenheim Museum in Bilbao, and Millennium Park in Chicago.

=== John Hancock Center ===
Iyengar served as structural project engineer on the John Hancock Center, led by senior engineer Fazlur Rahman Khan and architect Bruce Graham. The iconic X-braced tubular system of the Hancock was one of the first projects to use SOM Chicago's computer programs to verify and supplement hand calculations. When completed in 1969, it was the second tallest building in the world.

=== Sears Tower ===
Iyengar considered the Sears Tower one of his most significant projects, describing the experience as "what it must have felt like to build the Eiffel Tower - to create art out of structural technology." As with the John Hancock Center, Iyengar again served as structural project engineer under senior engineer Fazlur Rahman Khan and architect Bruce Graham. Instead of the X-bracing used in the Hancock, a bundled tube system was developed. When completed in 1982, it was the tallest building in the world for 16 years.

=== McCormick Place North ===
In 1986, Iyengar collaborated again with SOM architect Bruce Graham on the cable-stayed steel roof of the McCormick Exposition Center in Chicago. 4500 tons of steel were hung from cables supported by concrete pylons. The project was deemed an "engineering triumph" by Chicago Tribune architecture critic Paul Gapp.

=== Broadgate Exchange House ===
The Broadgate Phase 11 - Exchange House in London was one of Iyengar's most innovative structural engineering works. The building is directly over the top of Liverpool Street Station, a high traffic railroad station. But the rail station could not be touched so no supporting column could touch the ground. To solve this problem three different structural systems were used to support the 10 story tall building over the 78 meter clear span. These were an X-braced truss system, a 10 story catenary suspension system, and a parabolic arch system, resulting in a kind of building-bridge hybrid. Completed in 1990, the building was awarded the Twenty-five Year Award by the American Institute of Architects in 2015 as a testament to its "enduring significance."

=== Bilbao Guggenheim ===
Iyengar was invited by architect Frank Gehry to join the design team for the Guggenheim Museum Bilbao. Iyengar continued to work on the project after his retirement in 1992, being "heavily involved" in developing the steel trusses to achieve the large column-free spans desired inside the museum. While working on the Pritzker Pavilion band shell in 2000, Gehry was proud to call Iyengar "one of the best structural engineers."

== Gallery ==
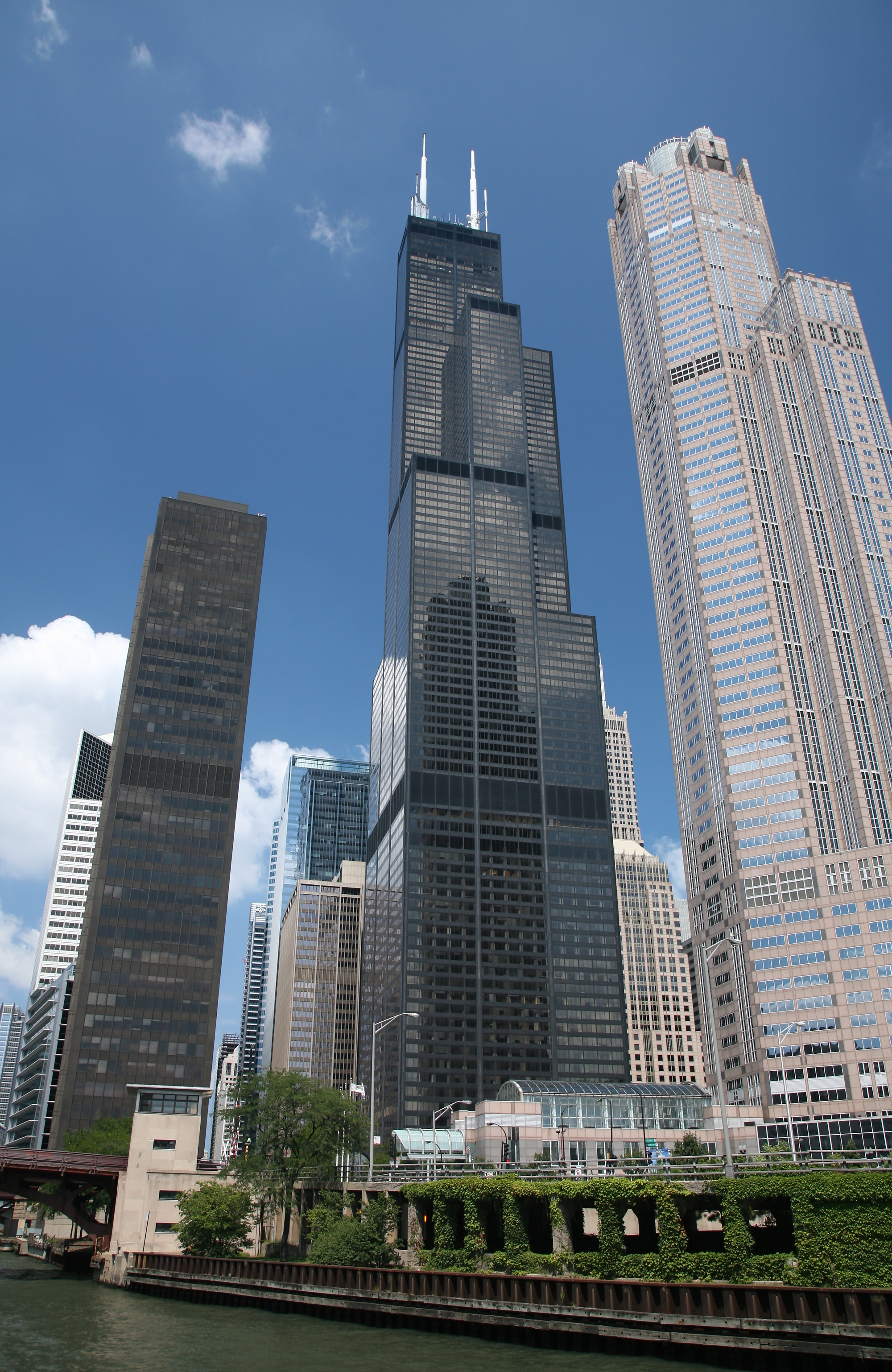
Willis Tower

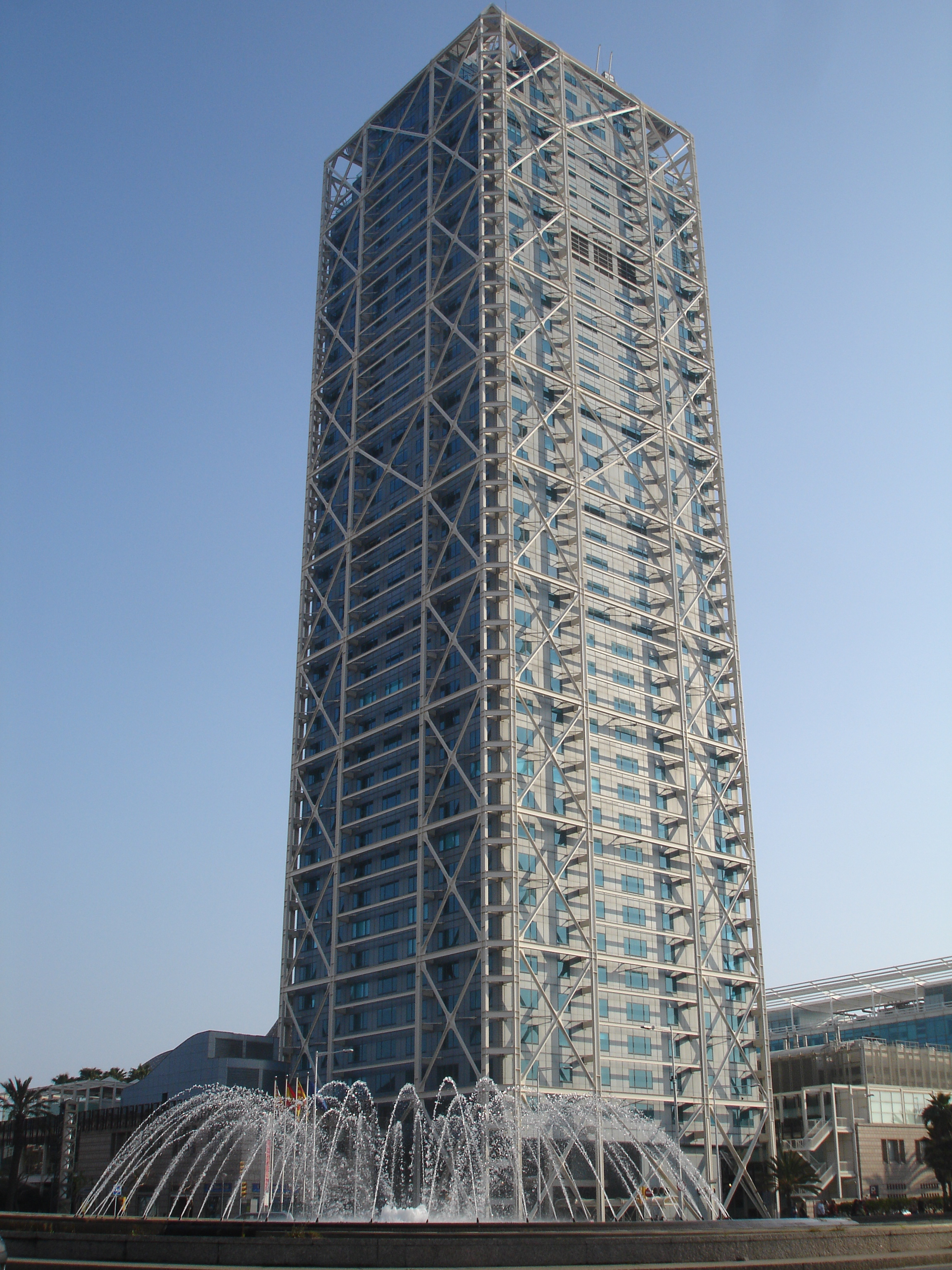
Hotel Arts, Barcelona

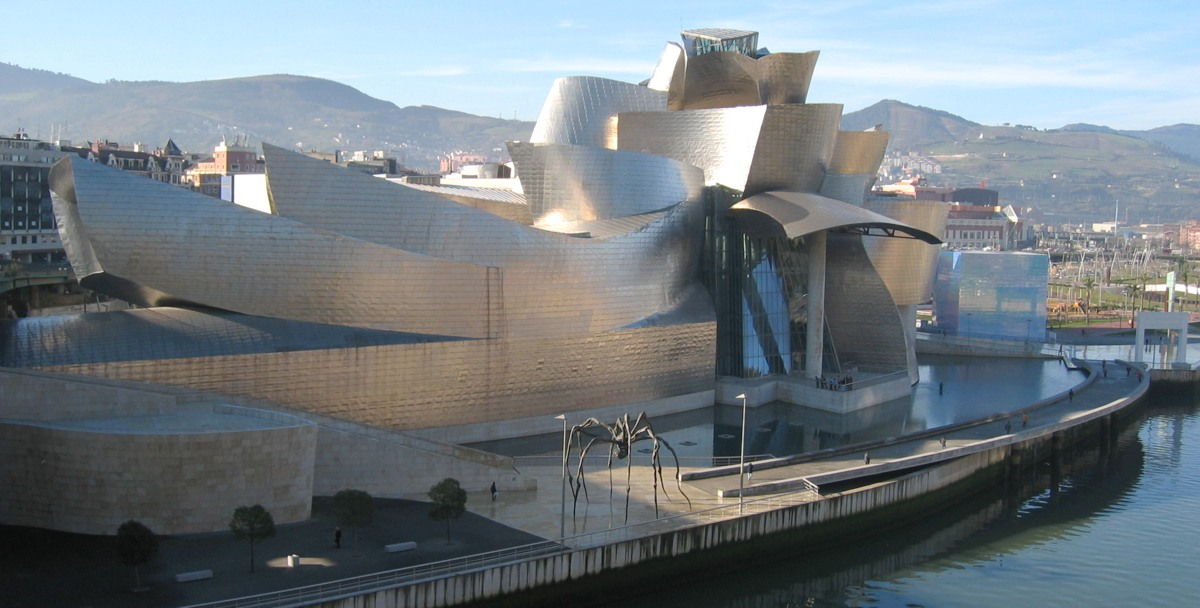
Guggenheim Museum Bilbao

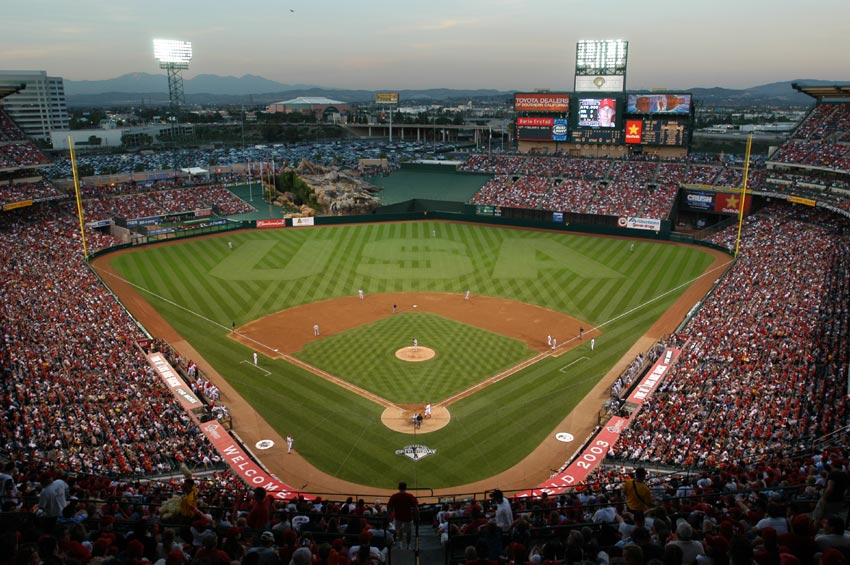
Angel Stadium of Anaheim

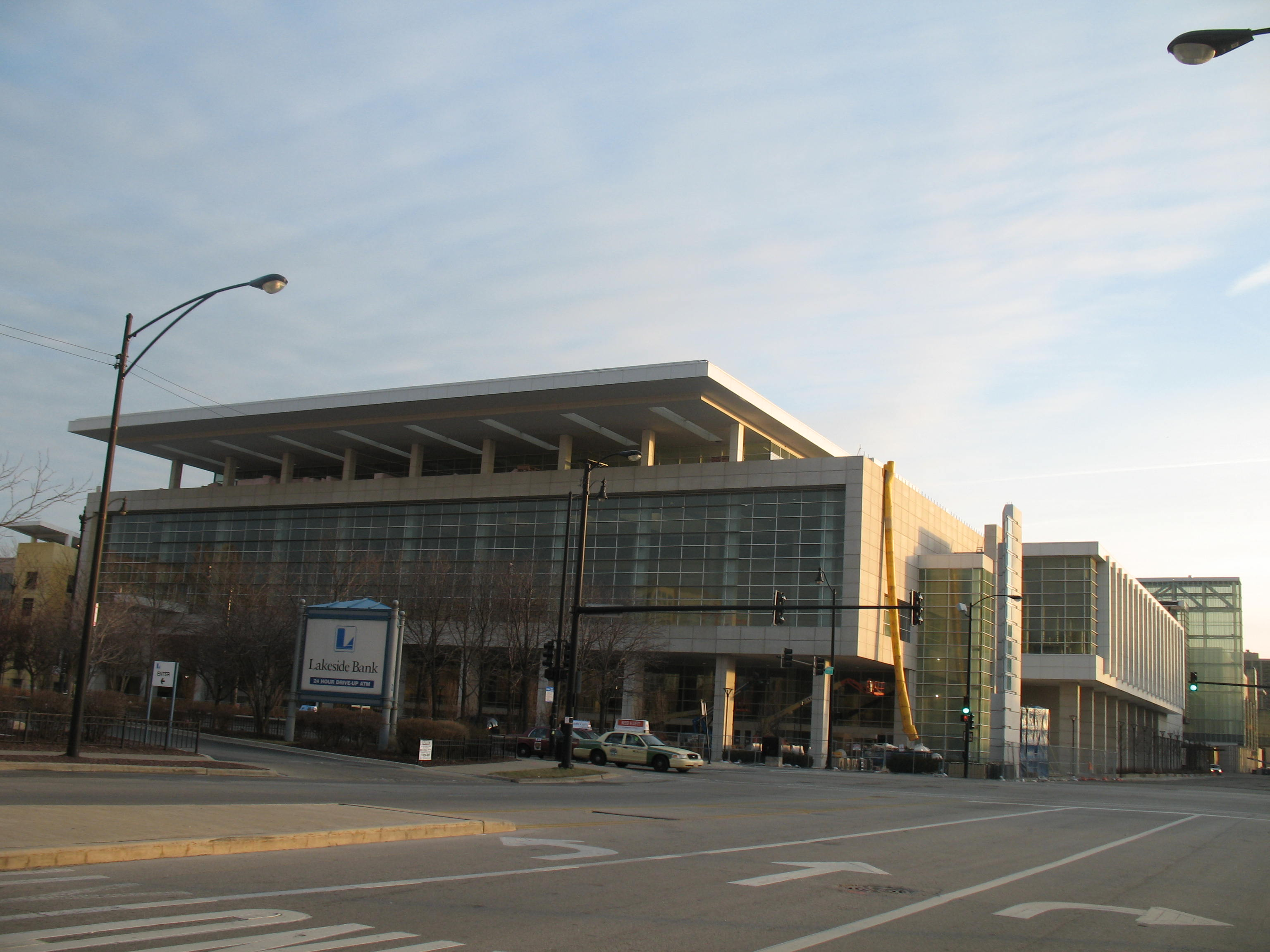
McCormick Place

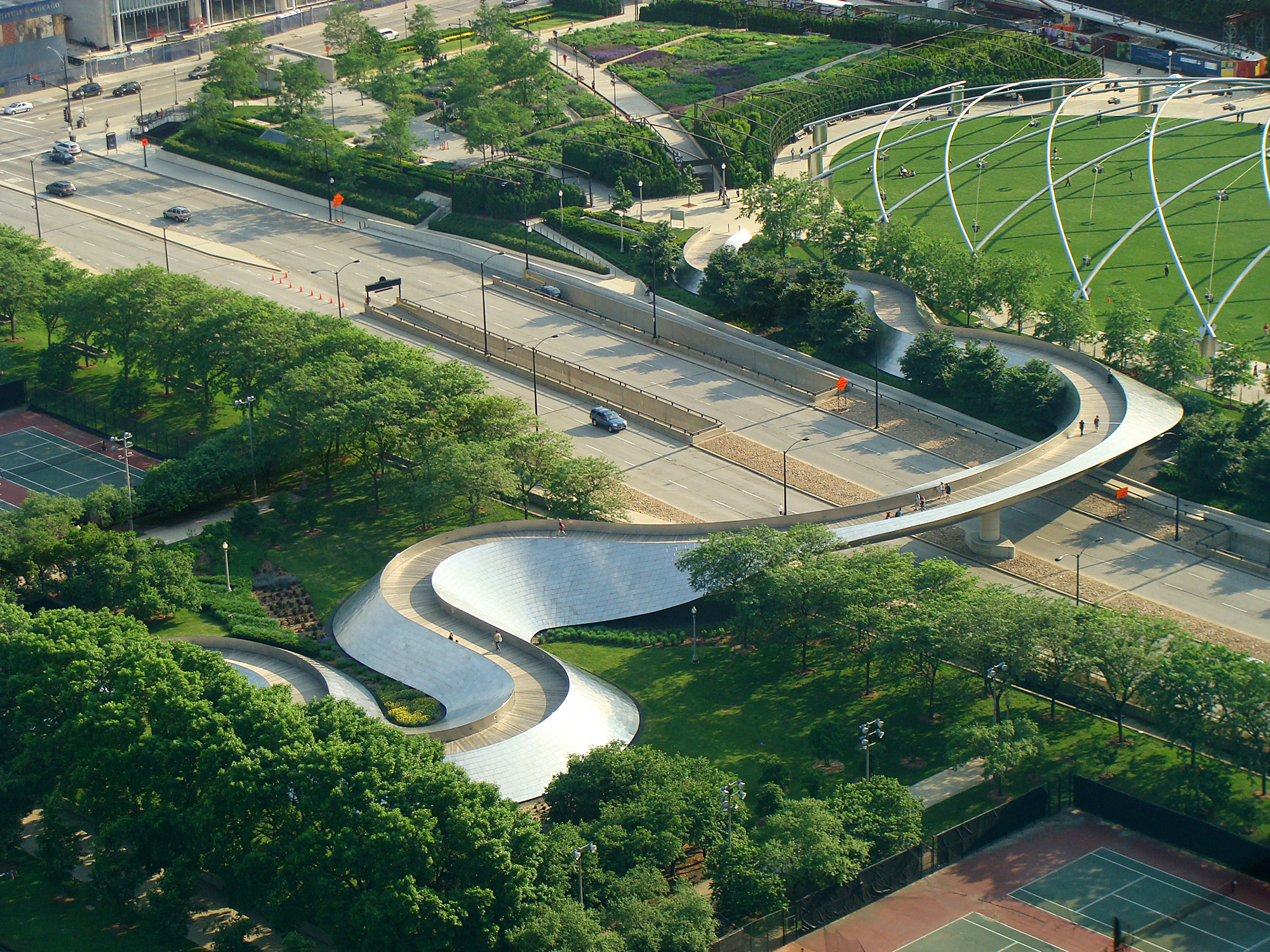
BP Pedestrian Bridge

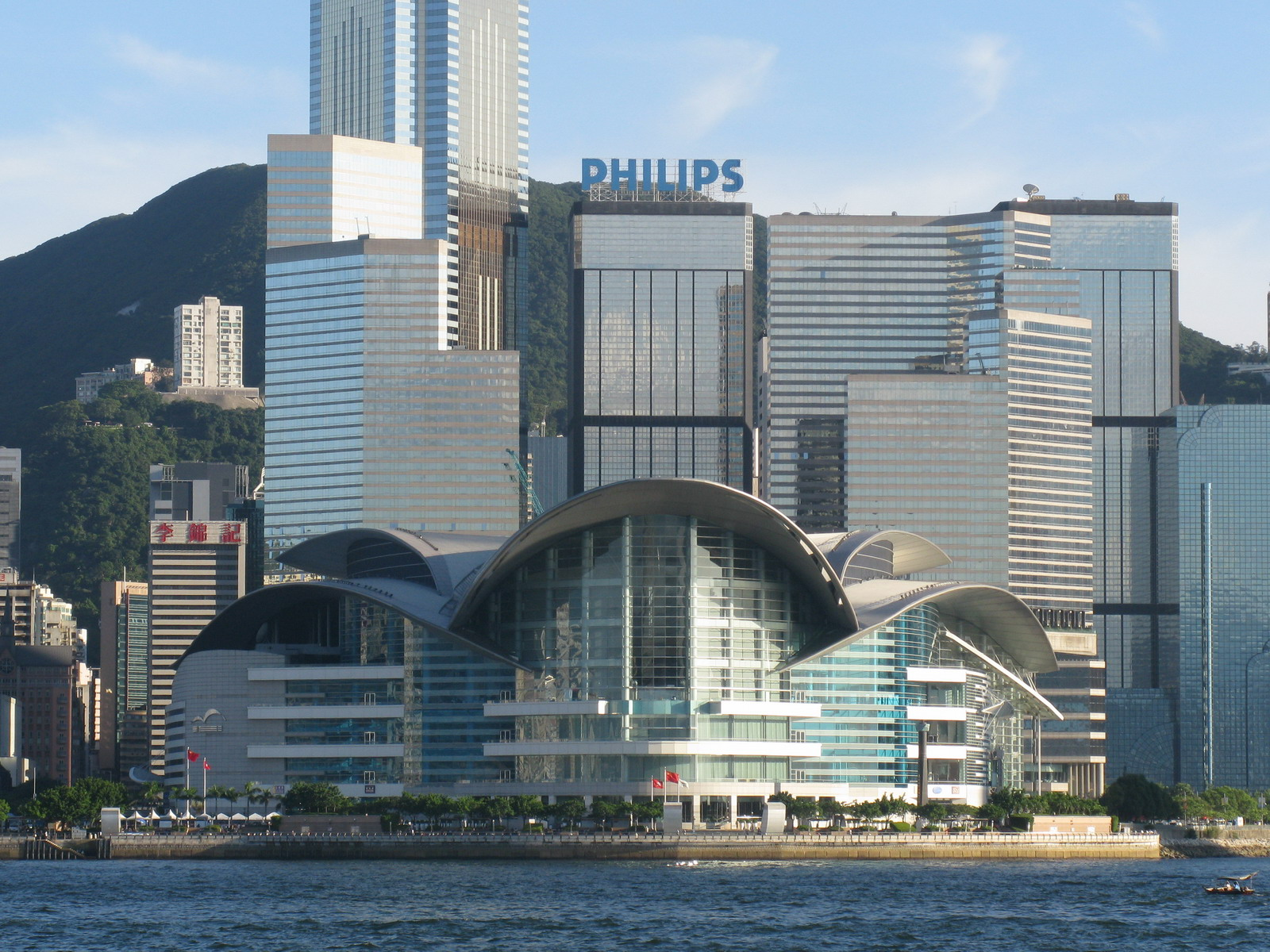
Hong Kong Convention and Exhibition Centre

== Honors and awards ==
Iyengar has received numerous awards including the 2006 Fazlur Khan Lifetime Achievement Medal, the 1999 Ernest E. Howard Award by the American Society of Civil Engineers, and the American Institute of Steel Construction Lifetime Achievement Award for "having made a science out of steel building analysis."

== Personal life ==
Iyengar met his wife Ruth Yonan Iyengar at a Sunday night fellowship at the Fourth Presbyterian Church in Chicago. They raised two children, Sona and Jay, in Chicago. After retiring in 1992, Iyengar continued to consult on structural projects. He died on July 4, 2019, due to complications from Parkinson's disease and heart disease in Fort Myers, Florida.

== See also ==
- Fazlur Rahman Khan
- Tung-Yen Lin
- Engineering Legends
- Skidmore, Owings and Merrill
