= North Chili, New York =

- Hamlet
- Location within New York Location within the United States
- Coordinates: 43°07′11″N 77°48′20″W
- Country: United States
- State: New York
- County: Monroe
- Town: Chili
- Elevation: 584 ft (178 m)
- Time zone: UTC-5 (Eastern (EST))
  - Summer (DST): UTC-4 (EDT)
- ZIP code: 14514
- Area code: 585
- GNIS feature ID: 958744

North Chili is a hamlet in the town of Chili, Monroe County, New York, United States. The community is located at the intersection of New York State Route 33 and New York State Route 259, 10 miles (16 km) west-southwest of downtown Rochester.
