= Bruce Graham =

Peruvian-American architect (1925–2010)

- Born: Bruce John Graham; December 1, 1925; La Cumbre, Valle del Cauca, Colombia
- Died: March 6, 2010 (aged 84); Hobe Sound, Florida U.S.
- Education: University of Pennsylvania School of Design; Case Western Reserve University; University of Dayton
- Occupation: architect

Bruce John Graham (December 1, 1925 – March 6, 2010) was a Colombian-born Peruvian-American architect. A longtime employee of the architecture firm Skidmore, Owings and Merrill, Graham designed buildings all over the world and was deeply involved with evolving the Burnham Plan of Chicago. Among his most notable buildings are the Inland Steel Building, the Willis Tower (formerly the Sears Tower), and the John Hancock Center. He was also responsible for planning the Broadgate and Canary Wharf developments in London.

Architectural historian Franz Schulze called him "the Burnham of his generation." He was a 1993 Pew Fellow.

== Life ==
Born on December 1, 1925, in La Cumbre, Valle del Cauca, Colombia, Graham was the son of a Canadian-born father who was an international banker, and a Peruvian mother. His first language was Spanish.

He attended Colegio San Jose de Rio Piedras, Puerto Rico, and graduated in 1944. He studied at the University of Dayton, Ohio, and Structural Engineering at the Case School of Applied Sciences in Cleveland, Ohio. He graduated from the University of Pennsylvania in 1948 with a degree in Architecture. When he first came to Chicago, he worked for Holabird and Root and joined the Chicago office of Skidmore, Owings and Merrill, the largest architectural firm in the United States, in 1951.

== Career ==
During his 40-year tenure at SOM, Bruce Graham designed notable buildings all over the world from his home in Chicago, to Guatemala, Hong Kong, London, Cairo, and many other cities. He designed the Willis Tower, tallest building in the world for nearly 36 years, the 100 story tall John Hancock Center, One Shell Plaza etc.

He was extremely involved with the University of Pennsylvania, especially the School of Fine Arts. He believed that teachers of architecture should be currently involved in its practice. He was committed to the study of architectural theory and started the SOM Foundation. He also taught an architectural studio at Harvard. Graham was a great collector of art. He befriended Alexander Calder, Joan Miró, Chryssa and Chillida, among others. He invited these artists to create public works of art for the city of Chicago. He believed that to create great work an architect should be informed by philosophy, history, music and literature.

== Design philosophy ==
Graham had studied structural engineering at Case Western and brought that knowledge and respect of the structure of an edifice to all his buildings. The Hancock building in particular, uses structural design for esthetic expression. Graham later expressed this in Hotel Arts in Barcelona and many other buildings including his buildings in London at Broadgate. Bruce Graham firmly believed that architecture like dance and music were a combination of structure and beauty. He believed that these forms of art represented the highest achievements of culture. Like other forms of Art, Graham believed that architecture was a result and a reflection of the morals of the culture in which it was built.

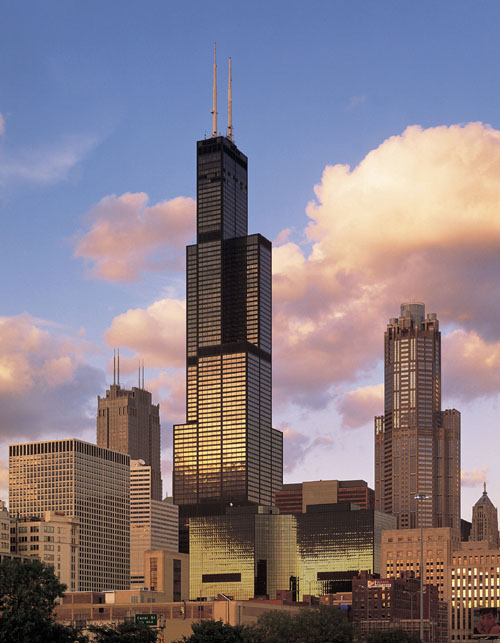
Willis Tower

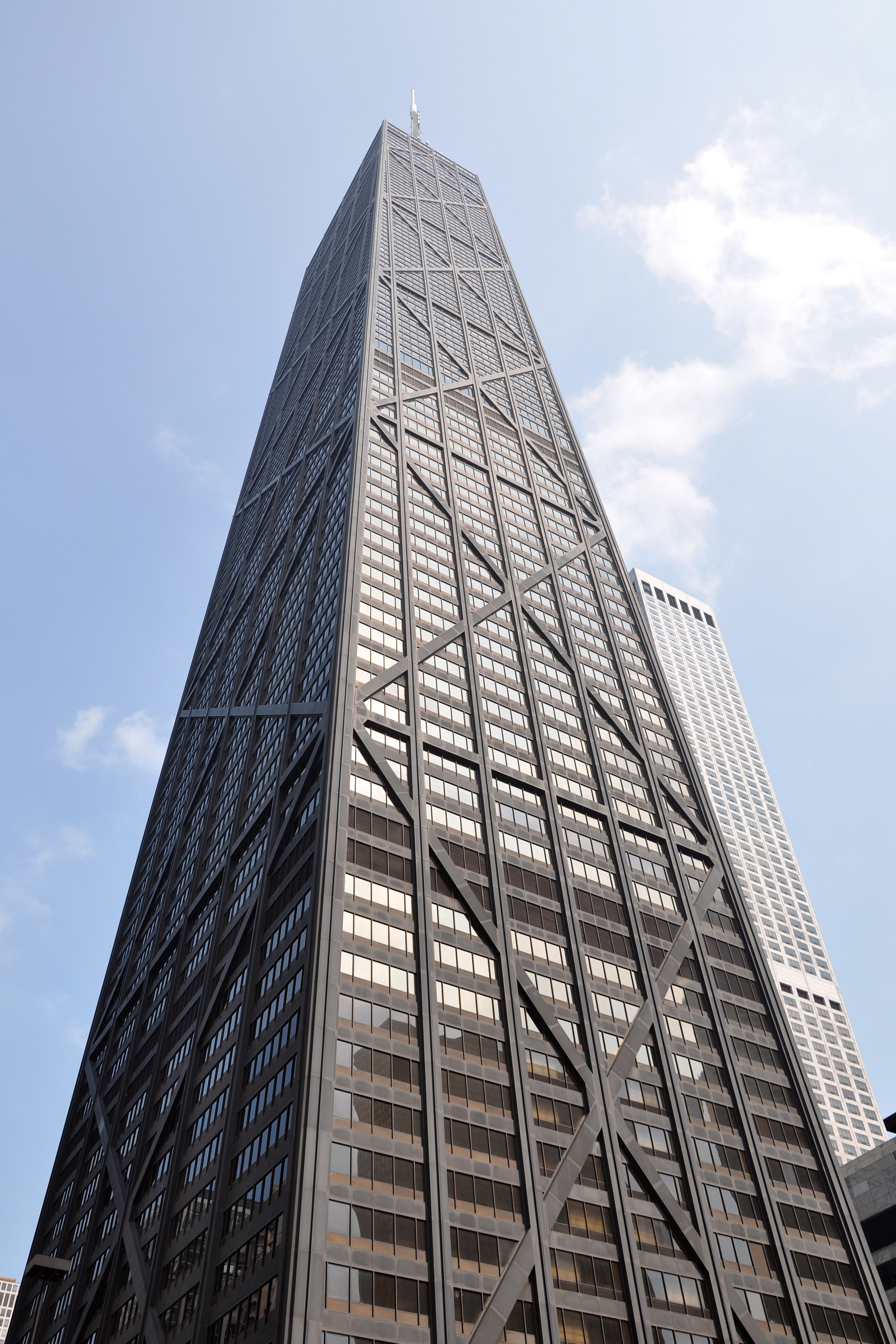
John Hancock Center

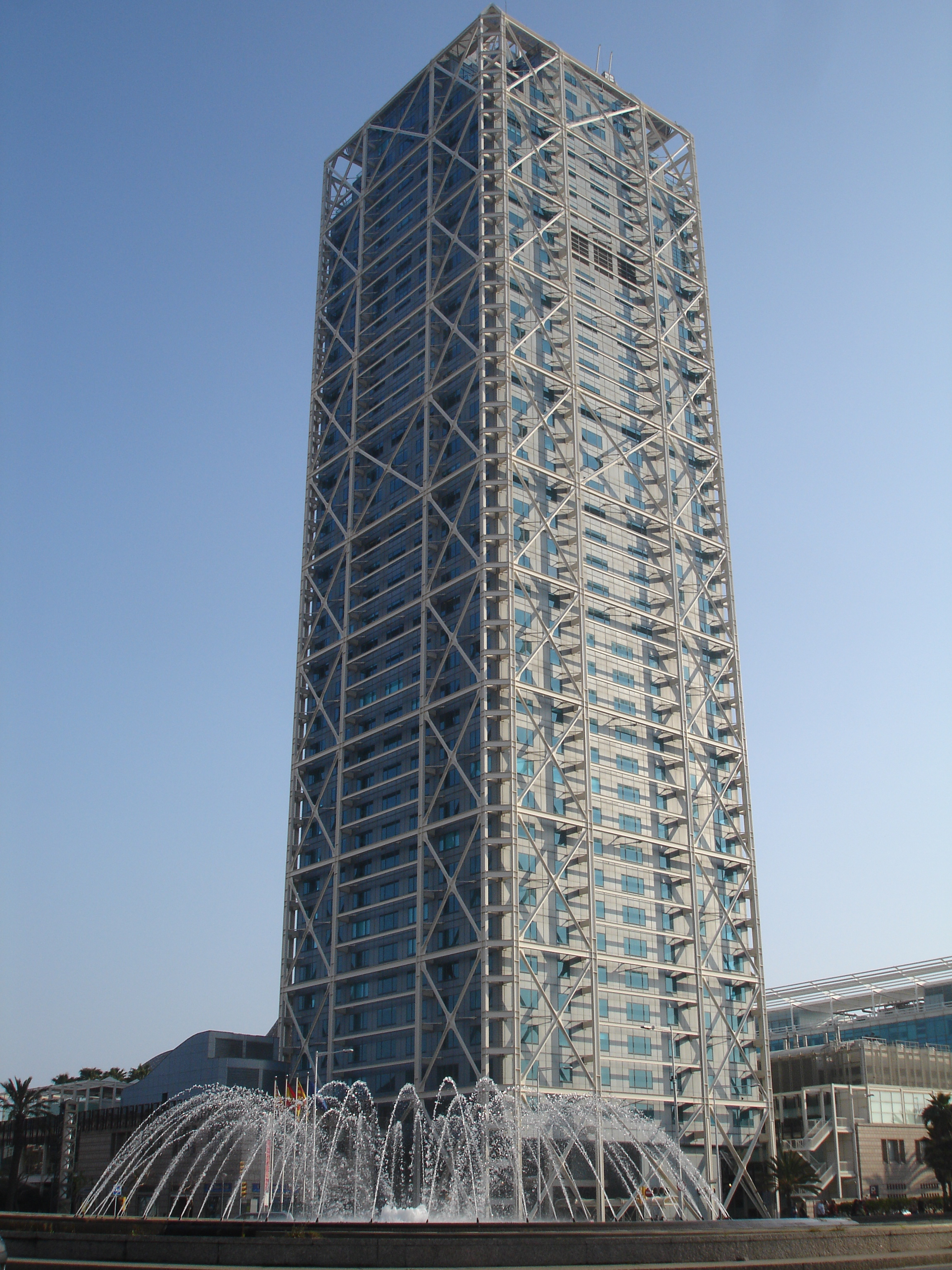
Hotel Arts

== England projects ==
Graham left a major influence on London, where he was responsible for designing the master plans for the massive Broadgate and Canary Wharf developments. He also designed nine buildings in London.

Graham said, "We design our buildings for the inhabitants and for those who see them from the street. We try to design buildings that are a part of London, not in an imitation of period styles but an invention."

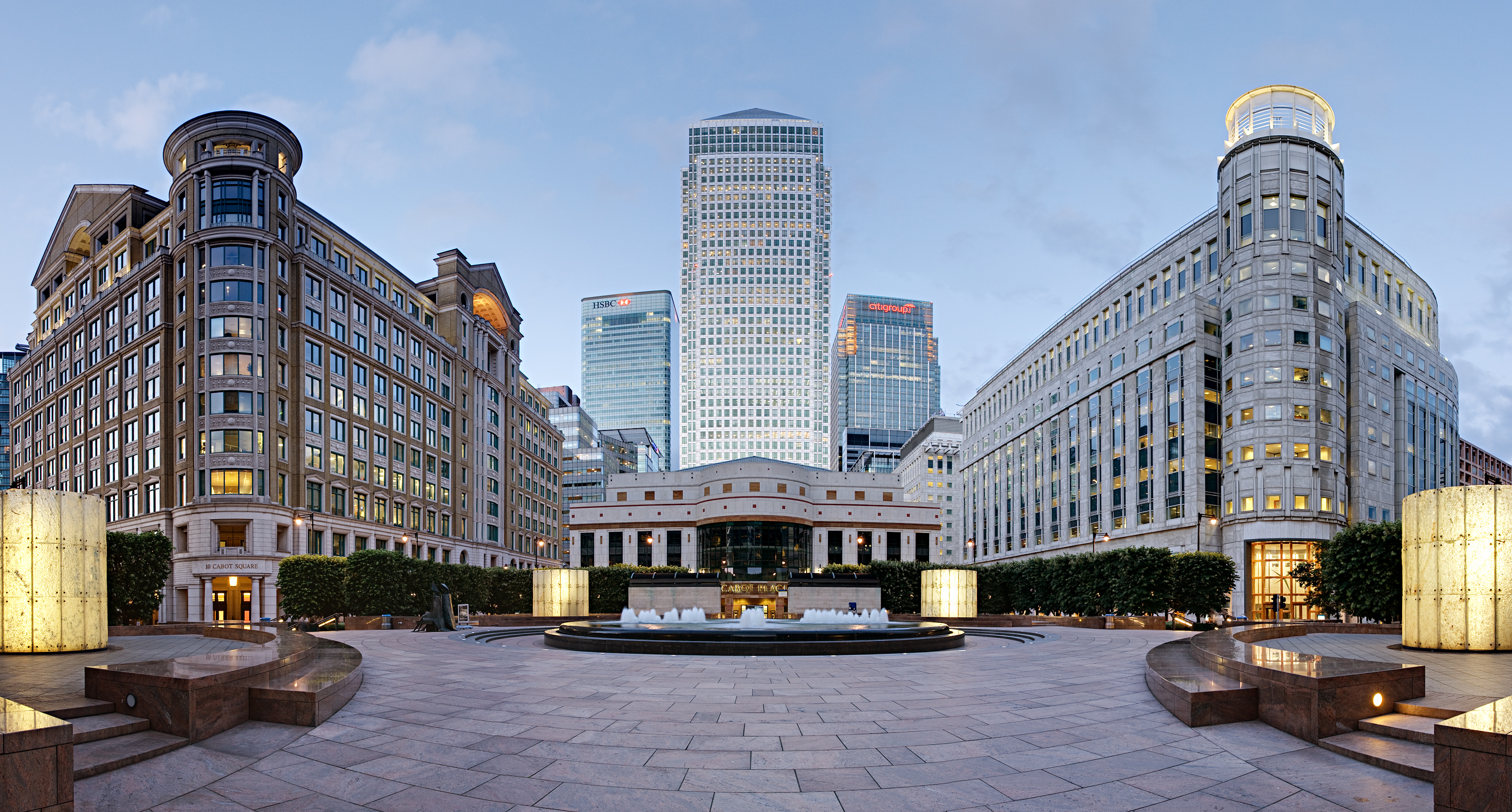
Canary Wharf, view east from Cabot Square

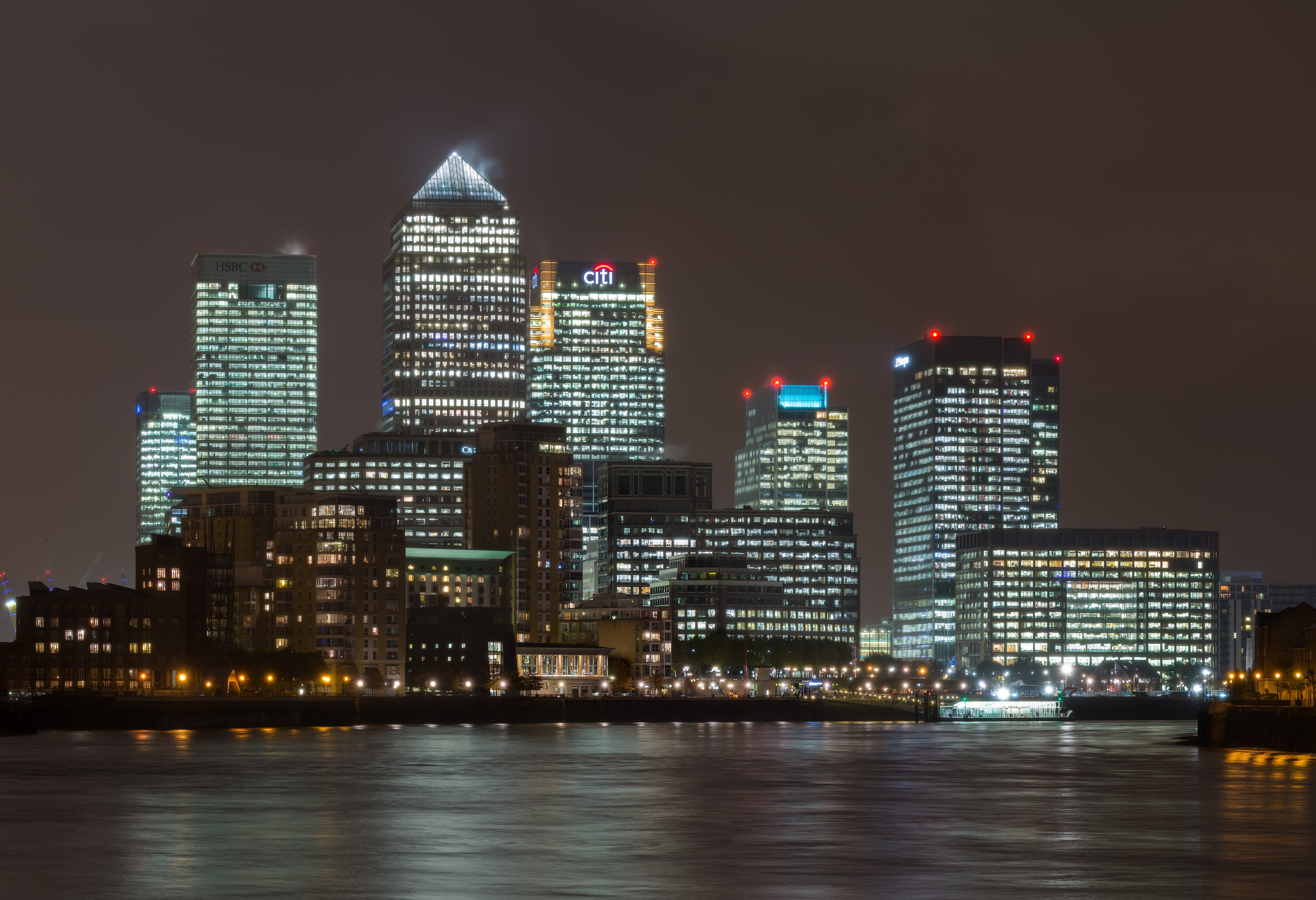
Canary Wharf

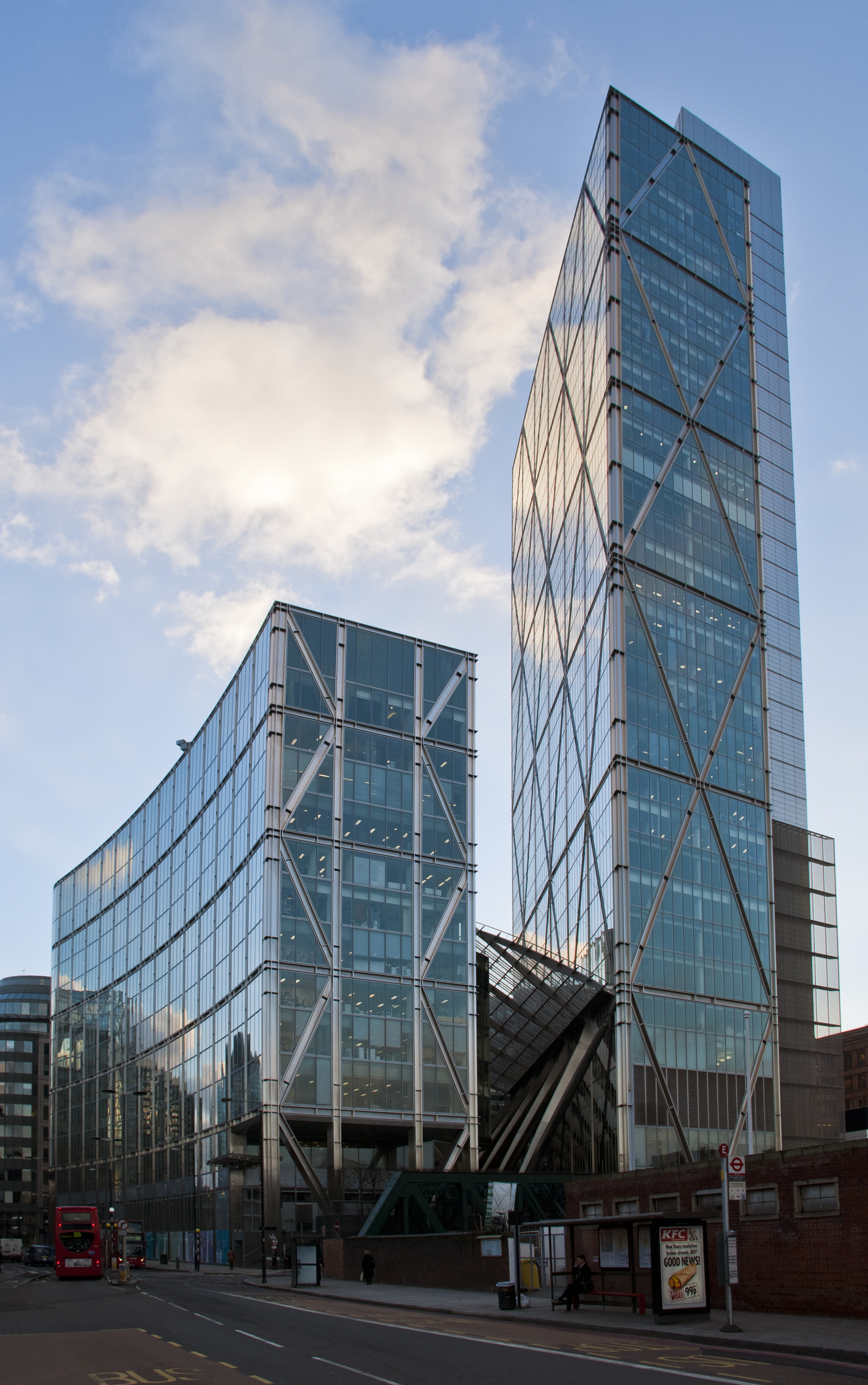
Broadgate

== Major works ==
- 1958 - Inland Steel Building, Chicago, Illinois, USA
- 1970 - John Hancock Center, Chicago, Illinois, USA
- 1973 - Sears Tower (renamed Willis Tower), Wacker Drive, Chicago, USA
- 1973 - First Wisconsin Plaza, Milwaukee, Wisconsin, USA
- 1982 - Broadgate, London, England
- 1988 - Canary Wharf, London, England
- 1992 - Hotel Arts, Barcelona, Spain

== Death ==
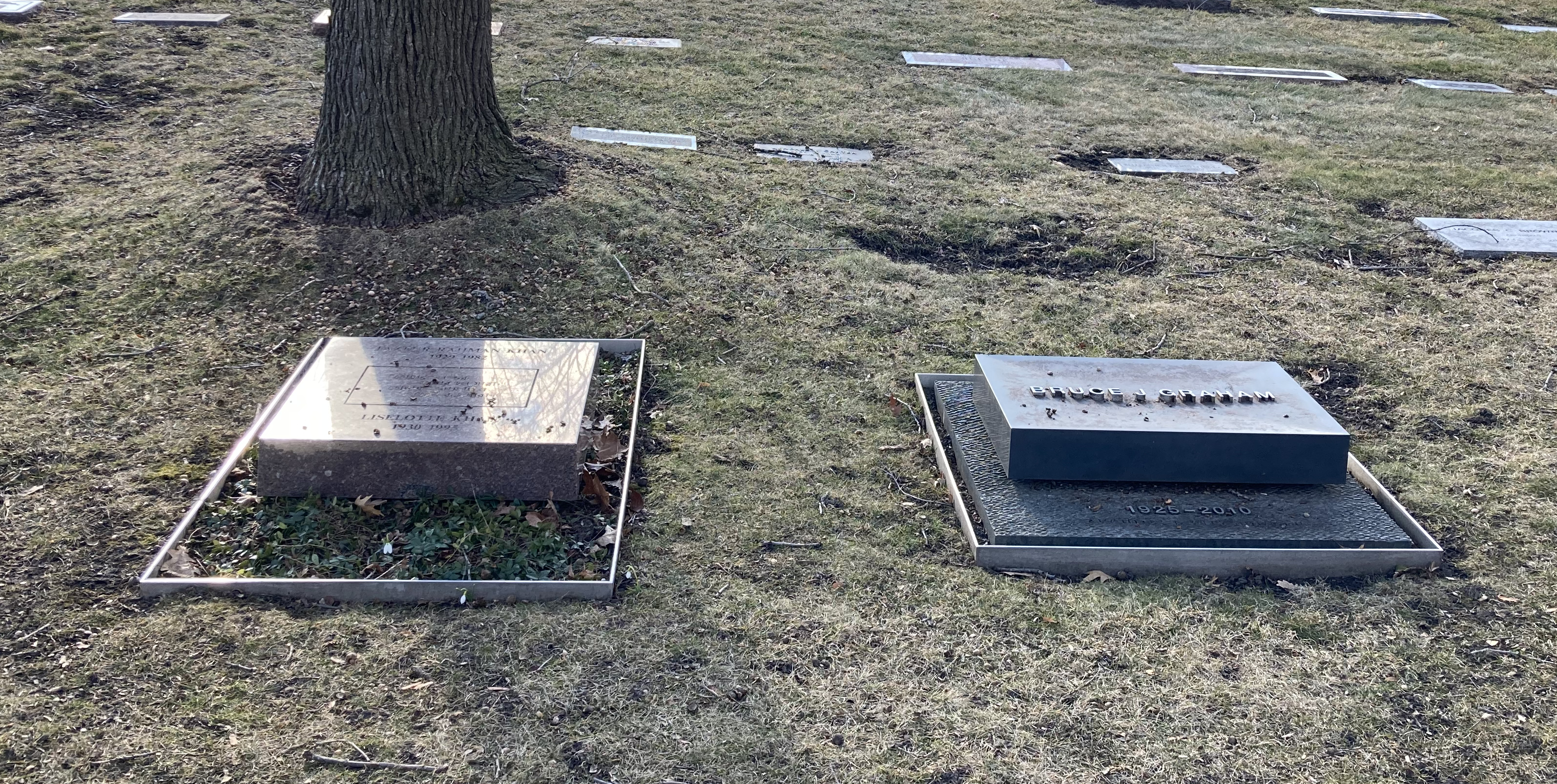
Graves of Fazlur Rahman Khan and Graham at Graceland Cemetery

Graham died March 6, 2010, at the age of 84 in Hobe Sound, Florida. The cause was complications of Alzheimer’s disease, said his son, George. Graham was buried at Graceland Cemetery in Chicago, Illinois next to Fazlur Rahman Khan.

On October 14, 2010, Chicago Alderman Brendan Reilly, 42nd Ward, dedicated the streets to the south and east sides of the John Hancock Center – one of Graham’s most iconic achievements – as Honorary Bruce J. Graham Way. It runs along Chestnut Street between Mies van der Rohe Street and Michigan Avenue and along Mies van der Rohe Street – named after famed architect, Ludwig Mies van der Rohe - between Chestnut and Delaware Streets.

== See also ==
- BMA Tower in Kansas City, Missouri
- Srinivasa 'Hal' Iyengar
