= Hotel Arts =

Hotel in Barcelona

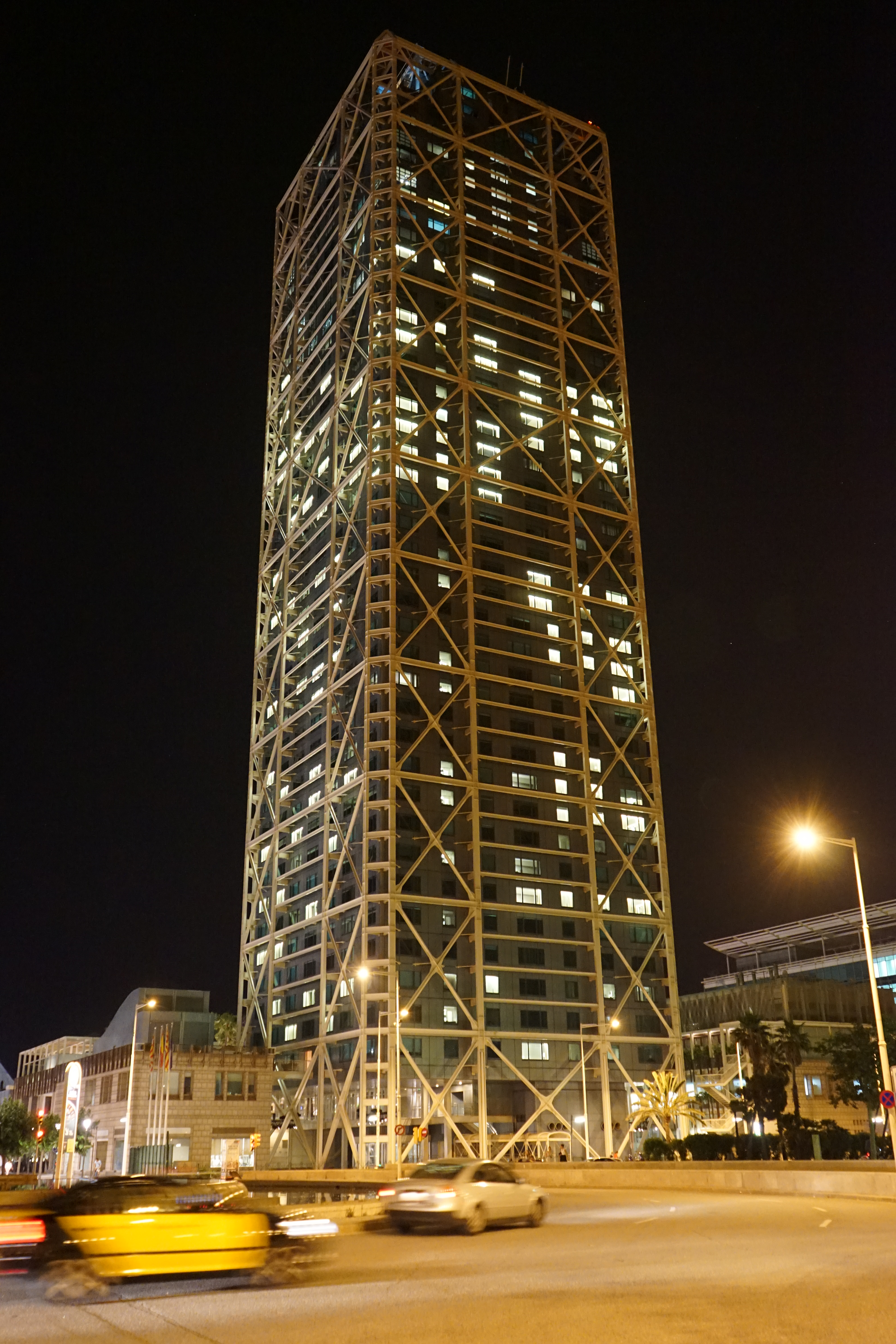
- Hotel Arts by night

- Location within Barcelona

General information
- Status: Under Renovation
- Type: Hotel
- Architectural style: Structural expressionism
- Location: Carrer de la Marina, 19 Barcelona, Catalonia, Spain
- Coordinates: 41°23′12″N 2°11′46″E
- Construction started: 1992
- Completed: 1994
- Owner: Host Hotels & Resorts, ABP
- Operator: Ritz-Carlton

Height
- Roof: 154 m (505 ft)

Technical details
- Floor count: 44

Design and construction
- Architects: Bruce Graham (Skidmore, Owings & Merrill)
- Structural engineer: Skidmore, Owings & Merrill LLP

The Hotel Arts is a 44-storey, 483 room luxury hotel on the seafront of Barcelona, in Catalonia, Spain. It is operated by Ritz-Carlton.

== History ==
Hotel Arts Barcelona is an ultra-luxury hotel, overlooking Barcelona’s Olympic Marina, and complemented by Frank Gehry’s world-famous El Peix sculpture, the hotel was designed by Bruce Graham of SOM and was built for the 1992 Summer Olympics. The hotel opened as a 10-storey building in 1992, then closed for the construction project to be completed.

The construction was finished in 1994 and it is an example of high-tech architecture. It is 154 metres tall, features 483 keys, and was designed by Skidmore, Owings & Merrill with Mr.Graham as partner in charge. The design team was led by Senior Architect Miguel Ruano, with Dr Agustí Obiol as local Architect of Record.

The Hotel Arts was planned to be managed by Ritz-Carlton chain before the Olympics, and opened in 1994 as the first hotel in Europe managed by Ritz-Carlton.

In 2006, the hotel was acquired by the consortium composed of the Investment Fund of Singapore's Government (GIC), Host Hotels, and ABP. The consortium paid 417 million euros to acquire the hotel, now owned by Archer Hotel Capital.

The hotel underwent a complete renovation in 2006, installing new technology and upgrading the rooms and bathrooms into modern, luxurious spaces. In 2009, the rooms of the 40th floor were replaced by meeting rooms.

In 2013, the Hotel Arts launched a digital guide for its guests. For the wedding of his niece in 2014, Lakshmi Mittal rented almost the whole building to house his guests. In 2014, the hotel recorded an average 80% occupancy.

In December 2015, Raúl Salcido became the new director of the hotel, replacing Rivero Delgado who was heading the hotel since 2010.

In June 2016, Ariana Grande rented the whole 36th floor.

As of December 2025, the hotel is currently undergoing its biggest renovation since it was originally developed, a significant investment which will reach completion in 2026. The transformation led by design studio Meyer Davis will refresh every space, from public areas to guestrooms. The first phase of its multi-stage transformation, i.e. the transformation of all guestrooms and suites, was completed in June 2025.

== Description ==
Hotel Arts is set on the shore of the Mediterranean Sea, its pool is surrounded by gardens and offers guests the chance to sunbathe next to one of Barcelona's most famous pieces of contemporary public art—a monumental golden fish-like sculpture by Frank Gehry, which was created for the 1992 Games.

The hotel has 483 rooms, including 56 executive suites, 28 duplex penthouses, the royal penthouse and the presidential penthouse.

A spa is located on the 43rd floor of the building.

In March 2019, the restaurant Bites opened in the hotel. The restaurant Enoteca, also located in the hotel, is the only one in town with a 2-star Michelin rating. The hotel has a total of 6 restaurants.

The Hotel Arts is considered the second most expensive hotel in Spain.

== See also ==
- Torre Mapfre, tied with Hotel Arts for the title of tallest building in Barcelona
- Torre Glòries, third-tallest building in Barcelona
