= Richard Weingardt =

- Born: March 23, 1938 (age 88); Sterling, Colorado, United States
- Died: September 24, 2013 (aged 75); Denver, Colorado, US
- Occupation: Structural engineer
- Spouse: Evelyn Scheberle (m. 1959)
- Children: 3

Richard George Weingardt (March 23, 1938 - September 24, 2013) was an American structural engineer. Upon his death, Weingardt had worked on over 5,000 projects.

== Personal life ==
Richard Weingardt was born in Sterling, Colorado, in 1938. His parents were Caroline and Martin Weingardt. His father was a general contractor. He had three siblings: one brother and two sisters. The family visited the Royal Gorge Bridge on a family vacation. That visit solidified Weingardt's desire to become an engineer.

He attended a Catholic school and graduated valedictorian. Weingardt started studying architectural engineering and changed his mind to study structural engineering. He earned a bachelor's degree and master's from the University of Colorado. He majored in structural engineering. He was particularly interested in the work of Félix Candela.

Weingardt was married to Evelyn Scheberle in 1959. He met her in high school. She was a cheerleader and he was a football player. She also worked as his business partner. He would father three children: two girls and a boy. He was a hobby painter, painting landscapes documenting the American West.

He died in, Denver, Colorado, in 2013 from complications from cancer. He was buried at Mount Olivet Cemetery.

== Career ==
"The world is run by those who show up as leaders, not just bystanders."

— Richard Weingardt

He once worked for the Bureau of Reclamation after graduation. During this time period, he worked on different projects, including transmission tower and power plants. He left that position and worked for a Denver-based private firm. The build the Denver Convention Center.

Weingardt founded his company, Richard Weingardt Consultants, in 1966. His firm designed three terminals at Denver International Airport. The project was awarded the American Society of Civil Engineers' "Civil Engineering Achievement Award" in 1997. The firm also designed work for the University of Colorado and designed mills in Russia. He was a writer, and documented engineering history and culture. He documented the life and work of George Washington Gale Ferris Jr. and wrote about the history of the American West. In 1978 he published 'Sound The Charge', a study of the 1869 battle between the US Cavalry and the Southern Cheyenne.

Weingardt served on a number of engineering boards, including the University of Colorado and the University of Texas. He was given an honorary doctoral degree at the University of Colorado. He was president of the American Consulting Engineers Council. He also was on committees for the Colorado Historic Preservation Review Board, the Colorado State Electrical Board, and Colorado's Long-Range Planning Subcommittee. He lectured at the Library of Congress. He was awarded the 2003 AAES Engineering Journalism Award.

=== Notable projects ===
- Integrated Teaching Lab, University of Colorado
- Harrah's New Orleans
- National Cowboy & Western Heritage Museum

== Bibliography ==
- Weingardt, Richard. Circles in the Sky: The Life and Times of George Ferris. Reston: ASCE Publications (2009). ISBN 0784410100
- Weingardt, Richard. Engineering Legends: Great American Civil Engineers : 32 Profiles of Inspiration and Achievement. Reston: ASCE Publications (2005). ISBN 0784408017
