= Carlisle Development Group =

Former affordable housing developer in Miami, Florida

- Company type: LLC
- Industry: Affordable housing, real estate development
- Founded: 1998
- Defunct: c. 2013
- Fate: Dissolved following federal fraud investigation; developments sold to Atlantic Pacific Companies
- Headquarters: Miami, Florida, U.S.
- Key people: Lloyd J. Boggio (co-founder, former CEO); Matthew S. Greer (former CEO)

Carlisle Development Group (CDG) was a Miami, Florida-based real estate development company that specialized in affordable housing financed through federal tax credit programs. Founded in 1998, it grew to become one of the largest affordable housing developers in the United States, completing more than 80 projects totaling over 9,000 units. The company was ranked the third-largest affordable housing developer in the United States by Affordable Housing Finance magazine in 2011 and 2012.

== History ==
Miami-based Carlisle Development Group began operating in 1998 and quickly grew into one of the largest tax credit affordable housing developers in the United States.

A 2012 profile reported: "Since opening its doors in 1998, the company has reached new heights, with more than 80 projects in its pipeline and more than 9,000 completed units totaling $1.2 billion in total development costs ... Carlisle was ranked the 3rd Largest Developer in Affordable Housing Finance magazine's 'Top 50 Developers and Owners' in 2011 and 2012."

In December 2016, Lloyd Boggio and Matthew Greer were both sentenced to prison for fraud cause related to Carlisle. Greer was sentenced to three years in prison for stealing $16 million from a federal program that finance affordable housing projects. Boggio was sentenced to about 5 years in prison after pleading guilty to money laundering.

== Management ==
The company was managed by Lloyd J. Boggio until 2007, when he brought on Matthew S. Greer. Greer's father, Bruce Greer, co-founded Carlisle with Boggio and several others.

Shortly afterwards, 1754 LLC, a Florida limited liability corporation which lists Greer as the sole manager, became the only publicly listed manager of Carlisle.

Multi-Housing News named CEO Matthew S. Greer "Executive of the Year," South Florida Business Journal recognized him as a "Mover & Shaker," and the Southeast Florida Chapter/Caribbean District Council of the Urban Land Institute named him "Young Leader of the Year."

== Federal Investigation ==
On May 4, 2013, the Miami Herald reported, "A Miami federal grand jury is investigating South Florida's preeminent affordable-housing developer, the Carlisle Development Group, on allegations that it bilked the U.S. government out of millions of dollars in tax subsidies used to finance more than a dozen rental projects in Miami-Dade and Broward counties. Carlisle is suspected of committing fraud by padding construction costs of the rental apartments to generate higher government-issued tax credits for itself and its investors, according to sources familiar with the probe. Prosecutors are trying to prove that top executives of Carlisle, a for-profit company, worked in cahoots with a Fort Lauderdale building contractor to unlawfully pocket those extra tax credits, the sources said."

According to a South Florida Business Journal report, the investigation "is focused on Carlisle CEO Matthew S. Greer and retired CEO and founder Lloyd J. Boggio."

A statement issued for the company said: "Carlisle intends to cooperate fully with this investigation and looks forward to a speedy resolution so it can get back to helping provide affordable housing for Miami's neediest. The company is proud of its track record, which includes housing over 13,000 low income residents, including working families, the elderly, youth aging out of foster care, and the formerly homeless."

== Federal Indictment ==
The Miami Herald reported Carlisle's principles were indicted by federal prosecutors on August 4, 2015 for multiple counts of conspiracy to commit theft of government money and property. "Principals Matthew Greer and Lloyd Boggio stole tens of millions of dollars in U.S. government subsidies by inflating construction costs and receiving kickbacks from contractors, according to charges filed in Miami federal court Tuesday ... In total, Greer, Boggio and four other defendants were accused of plundering $36 million in U.S. tax credits to line their pockets from 14 government-subsidized projects built mostly in Miami-Dade County."

== Miami-Dade County Projects ==
In 2013, Miami-Dade County Mayor Carlos Gimenez and the County Commission "delayed the certification of 11 affordable-housing developers because Carlisle Development Group is under investigation by a federal grand jury. Citing a Miami Herald report, Gimenez's administration put on the brakes because the feds suspect Carlisle defrauded the government of tax subsidies used to build low-income rental apartment projects in Miami-Dade and Broward counties."

In July 2013, Miami-Dade County commissioners, based on Mayor Gimenez's recommendation, nevertheless "approved a deal for Carlisle to redevelop a county-owned public housing complex at 1146 NW Seventh Court."

In reports on the award, local media said the project is in Commissioner Audrey M. Edmonson's district. "Edmonson, who received dozens of bundled campaign contributions from Carlisle entities for her reelection last year, is the firm's biggest supporter."

In April 2014, local media reported Carlisle, while remaining "under federal investigation for alleged fraud, received $2.6 million from Miami-Dade County to complete a rehabilitation project it acquired in 2011."

== Purchase by Atlantic | Pacific ==
In late 2013, Atlantic | Pacific Companies (A|P) announced plans to purchase certain developments from Carlisle Development Group.

A report said Carlisle sold four affordable housing developments because the group couldn't find financing while under investigation. The developments were acquired by Atlantic | Pacific Communities, one of A|P's platforms, after a series of local and federal government approvals.
