= Hannskarl Bandel =

German-American structural engineer

- Born: May 3, 1925; Dessau, Germany
- Died: December 29, 1993 (aged 68); Aspen, Colorado, U.S.
- Education: TU Berlin (Dipl-Ing, 1948); Technical University of Berlin (Dr-Ing, 1950)
- Engineering career
- Projects: Gateway Arch, Toronto City Hall, Madison Square Garden (IV)
- Significant design: Cable-supported roof systems, Catenary arch structural analysis

Hannskarl Bandel (May 3, 1925 Dessau, Germany – December 29, 1993 Aspen, Colorado, United States), was a German-American structural engineer.

== Early life ==
Hannskarl Bandel's father was an architect who owned a construction firm, and his mother came from the Brechtel family, which owned the well-known German construction company of the same name, founded in 1883 by Johannes Brechtel. This may have been a contributing factor in his choice of profession and study: he took a doctorate in engineering at Technische Universität Berlin. After working in the German steel industry, he came to the United States after World War II with no money and two suitcases full of books, hoping to build suspension bridges. Three years after joining the New York firm of engineer Fred Severud, he was made a full partner.

== Major works ==
With Severud, he made crucial, creative structural contributions to important mid-century architectural projects such as:

- the cylindrical towers and theater roof at Marina City in Chicago, Illinois
- the Toronto City Hall
- Ford Foundation Headquarters in New York City (the jungle building)
- the cable-suspension system for the roof of Madison Square Garden in New York City
- the Kennedy Center for the Performing Arts in Washington DC
- Philip Johnson's Crystal Cathedral in Garden Grove, California
- the Sunshine Skyway Bridge in St. Petersburg, Florida (demolished)

== Other work ==
It was Bandel who modified the catenary arch shape for Eero Saarinen's Gateway Arch project. When Saarinen tried to demonstrate his desired shape with a chain suspended in his hands, he couldn't achieve the slightly elongated, "soaring" effect he wanted; Bandel asked for the chain, came back in a few days, and delighted the architect by producing Saarinen's curve, as if by magic. Bandel had replaced some of the constant-sized links with variable links, thus changing the weight, the distribution of the weight, and the shape. While working on the design Bandel also factored in the loads upon the 630 foot arch caused by the wind and worked out that if he added more weight to the first 300 feet of the arch and placed 25,980 tons of concrete in the arch's foundation the center of gravity would be lowered to a stable location.

In 1978, he was elected a member of the National Academy of Engineering. After Fred Severud's retirement, the firm, despite Bandel's objections, was bought by a Hungarian engineer. Bandel left the firm and became the senior vice-president of DRC Consultants, working on cable-stayed bridges and various other structures. He was offered the chair of structural engineering at the University of Graz, Austria, in 1980, but turned down the offer, saying that his challenging assignments in America were more important to him than a prestigious professorship in Europe.

When the current Sunshine Skyway Bridge was constructed, Bandel was in charge of providing the construction engineering, planning, and management for the project. This bridge was constructed using pre-stressed concrete, which not only served as the roadway but as the structural support for the bridge, and featured a single span of supporting cables which incorporated his work in cable stayed bridge systems.

Bandel was also an expert on creative structural renovation and retrofitting. According to Benjamin Horace Weese, Bandel personally saved the deteriorating Guastavino tile dome at the Cathedral of St. John the Divine by New York City in 1972 by recommending that its supporting granite piers be insulated. In later years Bandel produced an innovative study for three-dimensional trusses to be assembled without tools in zero gravity, for the NASA Mars Pathfinder project.

== Death ==
Bandel died of heart failure while skiing at Aspen Highlands in Aspen, Colorado.

== In popular culture ==
James Franco's character in the 2008 movie Pineapple Express refers to Hannskarl when discussing his favorite civil engineers. In Jonathan Franzen's The Twenty-Seventh City protagonist Martin Probst clearly refers to Bandel as constructor of the Gateway Arch and puts him in the middle of a political conspiracy that finally unravels both, his professional life and his family.
