= Engineering Legends =

2005 book by Richard Weingardt

Engineering Legends: Great American Civil Engineers
- Author: Richard Weingardt
- Publisher: American Society of Civil Engineers
- Publication date: August 1, 2005
- Pages: 165
- ISBN: 978-0784408018

Engineering Legends: Great American Civil Engineers is a 2005 book by engineer Richard Weingardt. The book features a list of 32 engineering legends from the 1700s to the present, including Fazlur Khan, Hal Iyengar, Tung-Yen Lin, Benjamin Wright, and Fred Severud.

Weingardt describes how the ingenuity of these engineers, many of whom were immigrants to the United States, revolutionized the world, and how people take so many things for granted which were made possible because of the genius of these engineers. The book discusses the fact that while the engineering achievements are regularly recognized, the engineers themselves are rarely discussed. These engineers should become common household names.

The book explores the personal lives and professional accomplishments of its subjects, providing an in-depth look at the people behind these achievements. The book also illustrates the diversity surrounding these engineers, such as their differing backgrounds, their reasons for becoming engineers, the obstacles they faced, and their work in different disciplines of civil engineering. In the foreword, Henry Petroski describes the book as a work that "cannot help but inspire engineers, future engineers, and all who benefit (and will continue to benefit) from their work".

== Listed engineers ==
=== Empire Makers ===
- Benjamin Wright, chief engineer of the Erie Canal and Chesapeake and Ohio Canal.
- Stephen H. Long, a U.S. army explorer, topographical engineer, and railway engineer.
- Theodore D. Judah, a railroad engineer who planned the first Transcontinental Railroad.
- William L. Jenney, considered "the Father of the American skyscraper".

=== Environmental Experts ===
- Ellen Swallow Richards, a pioneer for women in science and engineering.
- Holly A. Cornell, founding member of CH2M Hill.
- William W. Moore, worked on seismic design criteria for Trans-Alaska Pipeline System.
- Fu Hua Chen, a soil engineering pioneer.

=== Transportation Trendsetters ===
- Octave Chanute, railroad engineer and aviation pioneer.
- John E. Greiner, railroad engineer.
- Clifford Holland, tunnel engineer whose responsible for the Holland Tunnel in New York City.
- Roy Peratrovich, Jr., bridge engineer whose projects include two highline structures spanning 1,000 and 1,500 feet for the Trans-Alaska Pipeline System.

=== Builders of Bridges ===
- Emily Warren Roebling, one of the Chief Engineers for the Brooklyn Bridge.
- Ralph Modjeski, an engineer that spanned two eras - the railroad truss bridges to the suspension bridge. An example project is Broadway Bridge (Portland).
- John A. L. Waddell, of the most honored American Civil Engineers. An example project is the South Halstead Street Vertical Lift Bridge.
- David B. Steinman, designer of the Mackinac Bridge.

=== Structural Trailblazers ===
- Fazlur R. Khan, a Bangladeshi structural engineer and architect responsible for the tubular structural concept in tall buildings.
- Fred N. Severud, a Norwegian structural engineer, whose projects include the St. Louis Gateway Arch and Madison Square Garden in New York City.
- Willard E. Simpson a structural engineer whose work includes Floyd Casey Stadium and solutions to deal with expansive clays.
- Tung-Yen Lin, a structural engineer who was the pioneer of standardizing the use of prestressed concrete.

=== Daring Innovators ===
- George Washington Gale Ferris Jr., bridge engineer and inventor of the Ferris wheel.
- Jack R. Janney, a pioneer in forensic engineering.
- Henry J. Degenkolb, a pioneer in seismic design.
- Srinivasa Iyengar, an Indian American Civil engineer working with high-rise, long-span and stadium structures. A notable project he participated in was the John Hancock Center.

=== Movers and Shakers ===
- Kate Gleason invented mass-produced low cost housing built out of concrete.
- Richard Buckminster Fuller pioneer in Geodesic dome. One of his domes include Spaceship Earth (Epcot).
- George D. Clyde, former Governor of Utah.
- Albert A. Dorman, whose projects include Air Force One Complex at Andrews Air Force Base and Batman Bridge.

=== Educators Extraordinaire ===
- Hardy Cross, an educator and structural theoretician. One of his influential structure methods is Moment distribution method.
- Nathan Newmark helped develop design criteria for tall earthquake-resistant structures and large scale oil pipelines.
- Mario G. Salvadori, a professor and expert in thin-shell concrete structures. An example project is CBS Building.
- Roland C. Rautenstraus helped modernize Colorado's entire highway system.
