= Balcom and Vaughan =

American pipe organ building company

Balcom and Vaughan Pipe Organs Inc. is the oldest pipe organ builder in the greater northwest. The company was founded in 1921 by C.M “Sandy” Balcom, who had previously worked for another organ builder, Sherman, Clay & Co. At the end of the silent film era, Balcom and Vaughan began to focus more on building or altering church instruments. Organs bearing Balcom's design influence were often small, unit organs, sometimes consisting of only three manuals. These projects commonly contained an amount of old pipe work or components from redundant or altered instruments. As tastes began to lean toward European-based designs, Eugene “Gene” Nye was influential in revisioning Balcom and Vaughan instruments of the 1960s to respond to those tastes.

The return of William J. Bunch to Balcom and Vaughan, after a period of time working for Aeolian Skinner firm, as the vice-president of the production marked a zenith for the company. Bunch took over the company when Balcom retired in 1966. Instruments from this period are noteworthy for their classic style and a particular basic design, and were often built with a complete chorus on the great, and frequently contained a bright unit reed (known as the “hautbois”). Metal pipe work and reeds were generally sourced from the Jaques Stinkens firm of Zeist, Holland, or, when the exchange rate was not as favorable to U.S. dollar, from Thomas Anderson, the former chief pipe maker of Aeolian Skninner. Instruments also contain(ed) a flue or reed pipework, A.R. Schopps Sons of Alliance, Ohio.

Upon the retirement of Bill Bunch, John K. Moir, hitherto General Manager and employee since 1979, took over as president. The Seattle shop location was closed 1996, and the operation was moved to Everett, Washington, where it continues today.

The company has built more than 200 pipe organs since the 1960s.

== Organs built by Balcom and Vaughan ==
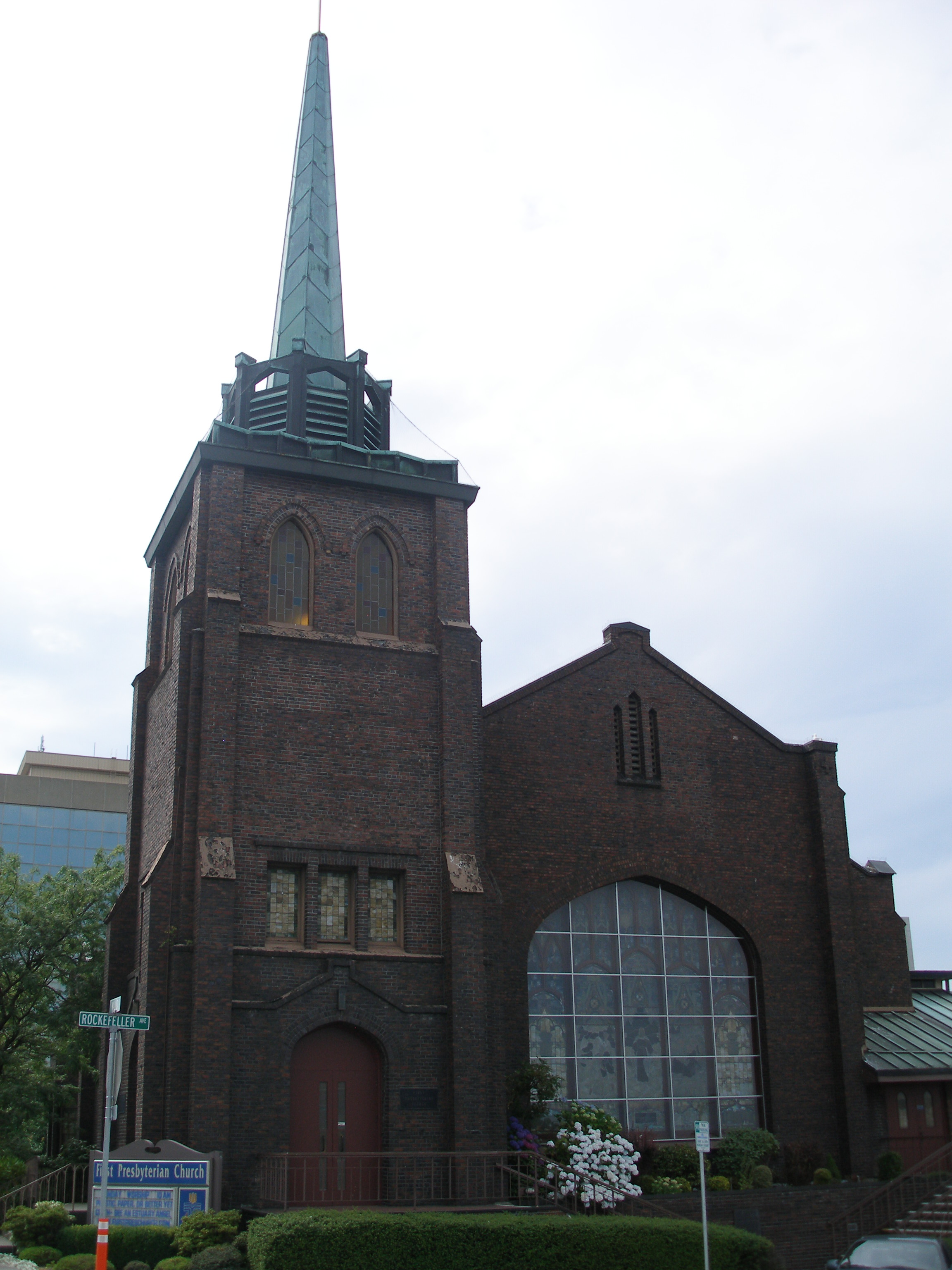
The pipe organ in the First Presbyterian church in Everett, Washington was installed by Balcom and Vaughn in 1991.

- Opus 113 - St. Mary the Assumption Roman Catholic Church, Whittier, California
