= Bruce Balcom =

Canadian material scientist and chemist

Bruce Balcom is a Canadian material scientist and chemist, currently a Canada Research Chair at University of New Brunswick He specializes in magnetic resonance imaging (MRI).
