= Tung-Yen Lin =

Chinese-American structural engineer

- 林同棪
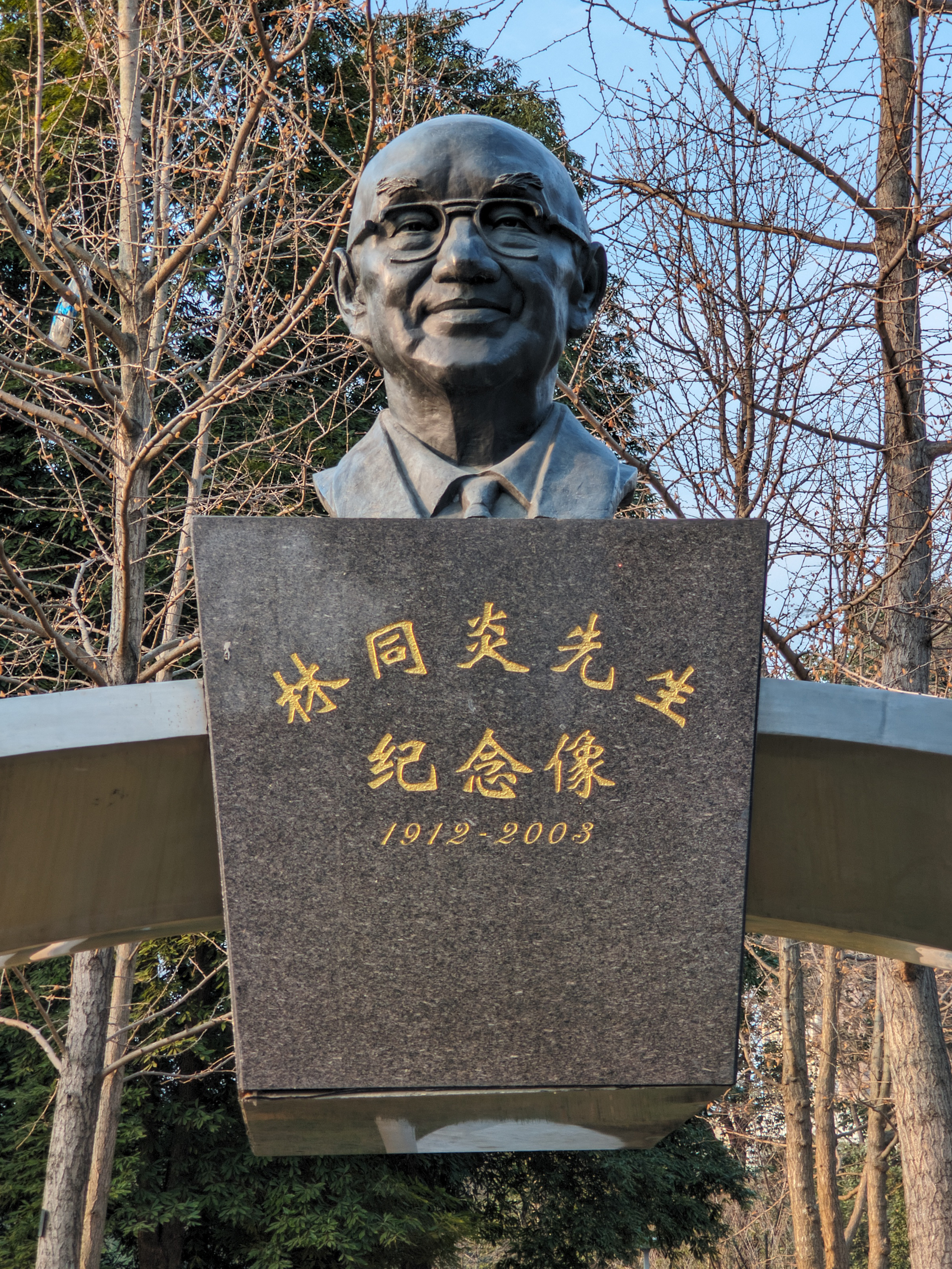
- The Memorial Statue of Tung-Yen Lin in the Xipu Campus of Southwest Jiaotong University
- Born: November 14, 1912; Fuzhou, China
- Died: November 15, 2003 (aged 91); El Cerrito, California
- Education: Southwest Jiaotong University; University of California, Berkeley
- Occupation: Structural engineer
- Notable work: Moscone Convention Center; Kuan Du Bridge; National Racetrack
- Spouse: Margaret Kao Lin
- Awards: National Medal of Science (1986)

Tung-Yen Lin (Chinese: 林同棪; pinyin: Lín Tóngyán; November 14, 1912 – November 15, 2003) was a Chinese-American structural engineer who was the pioneer of standardizing the use of prestressed concrete.

== Biography ==
Born in Fuzhou, China, as the fourth of eleven children, he was raised in Beijing where his father was a justice of the ROC's Supreme Court. He did not begin formal schooling until age 11, and only so because his parents forged his birth year to be 1911 so that he would qualify. At only 14, entered Jiaotong University's Tangshan Engineering College (now Southwest Jiaotong University), having earned the top score in math and the second best score overall in the college entrance exams for his entering class. He graduated with a bachelor's degree in civil engineering in 1931 and left for the United States, where he earned his master's degree in civil engineering from the University of California, Berkeley in 1933. Lin's master's thesis was the first student thesis published by the American Society of Civil Engineers (ASCE). Lin returned to China after graduation to work with the Chinese Ministry of Railways. Before too long he earned the reputation of being a "good engineer". This positioned him to become the chief bridge engineer of the Yunnan-Chongqing Railway and oversaw the design and construction of more than 1,000 bridges. He returned to UC Berkeley to join its faculty in 1946, and began to research and develop the practice of prestressed concrete. He did not invent prestressed concrete, but he did develop it for practical use. The inventor of prestressed concrete is Eugene Freyssinet of France. Lin retired in 1976 to work full-time at T.Y. Lin International, a firm he founded in 1954. After selling that firm, he left it to found Lin Tung-Yen China on June 1, 1992, which oversees engineering projects in China.

When Lin received the National Medal of Science from President Ronald Reagan in 1986, he handed over a 16-page plan for a 50-mile (80-kilometre) bridge linking Alaska and Siberia across the Bering Strait, a project he dubbed the Intercontinental Peace Bridge. He also proposed a bridge across the Strait of Gibraltar that would have 16,000-foot (4,900-metre) spans and 3,000-foot (910-metre) tall towers. Lin was also the first recipient of the ASCE lifetime achievement in design award, and the society renamed the prestressed concrete award to the T.Y. Lin Award.

Engineers were often architects in the early 1900s, but by the late 1940s, this aspect of engineering had been all but forgotten. Lin was saddened by this situation commenting:

But during the last century, particularly in America, we rushed our construction. We have only so much budget to build so many bridges. So we put emphasis on economy. And therefore mass production, et cetera. And almost forgot about aesthetics, in America. Of course, there are beautiful bridges, but in general, engineers didn't think about beauty.

Lin fought against the pressures of economy by incorporating more aesthetics into his bridges and developing new techniques that increased economy. Lin believed that "engineering approach should be a global vision of the bridge. To fit the environment and to express the structural forces and moments, and nature itself." Attention had to be paid not only to the details of the bridge, but also to the surrounding landscape. Pre-stressing the concrete allowed Lin to accomplish the goal of incorporating unique shapes without sacrificing the bottom line.

Among his engineering accomplishments were the Moscone Convention Center in San Francisco, the Kuan Du Bridge in Taiwan, and the roof of the National Racetrack in Caracas, Venezuela. In 1996, he was named the 53rd National Honor Member of Chi Epsilon, the national civil engineering honor society.

He died of a heart attack at age 91. His El Cerrito, California home is the world's first residential structure made of prestressed concrete. His home features a 1,000-square-foot (93-square-metre) dance floor serving as monument to his favorite pastime, dancing. His widow, Margaret Kao Lin is also the daughter of a former ROC supreme court justice.

== See also ==
- Bering Strait crossing
- Strait of Gibraltar crossing
- Engineering Legends
- Fazlur Rahman Khan
