= Lun*na Menoh =

Lun*na Menoh is a Japanese-born visual artist, fashion designer and musician who lives in Los Angeles. In the early 2000s Lun*na partnered with Sukho Lee for the band Seksu Roba, created the musical entity Jean Paul Yamamoto and currently performs with Saori Mitome as Les Sewing Sisters. In 2019 Les Sewing Sisters held a musical tour through 22 closets of private homes in Los Angeles.

Since the early 1990s she has presented work at Los Angeles art spaces and unique venues including Beyond Baroque, Track 16 Gallery, Velaslavasay Panorama. South Coast Plaza and the defunct Culver City venue Royal/T. She moved to Los Angeles from Japan in 1989 and is married to author and publisher Tosh Berman.
