= Wallace Berman =

American artist (1926–1976)

- Born: February 18, 1926; Staten Island, New York, U.S.
- Died: February 18, 1976 (aged 50); Topanga Canyon, California, U.S.
- Known for: Assemblage art experimental film collage zines
- Movement: Beatnik Hippie
- Spouse: Shirley Morand
- Children: 1 (Tosh)

Wallace "Wally" Berman (February 18, 1926 – February 18, 1976) was an American experimental filmmaker, assemblage, and collage artist and a crucial figure in postwar California art.

== Personal life and education ==
Wallace Berman was born in Staten Island, New York in 1926. In the 1930s his family moved to Boyle Heights, Los Angeles.

Berman was discharged from high school for gambling in the early 1940s and became involved in the West Coast jazz scene. Berman wrote a song with Jimmy Witherspoon. He attended classes at Jepson Art Institute and Chouinard Art Institute in the 1940s. For a few years from 1949 he worked in a factory finishing furniture. There, he began creating sculptures from wood scraps. This led him to become a full-time artist by the early 1950s, and to involvement in the Beat Movement. He married Shirley Morand (aka Shirley Berman) and they had a son, Tosh, in 1954.

In 1957, Berman moved from Los Angeles to San Francisco, where he mostly focused on his magazine Semina, which consisted of poetry, photographs, texts, drawings and images he assembled. In 1961, he returned to L.A., then moved to Topanga Canyon in 1965. He started his series of Verifax Collages in 1963 or 1964. Director Dennis Hopper, a collector of Berman's work, gave Berman a small role in his 1969 film Easy Rider. He produced work until his death in 1976 in a car accident caused by a drunk driver.

As a child, Berman told his mother he would die on his 50th birthday, which is precisely what occurred.

== Artistic career ==
Semina 4, ca. 1959 . Wallace Berman papers, Archives of American Art, Smithsonian Institution.

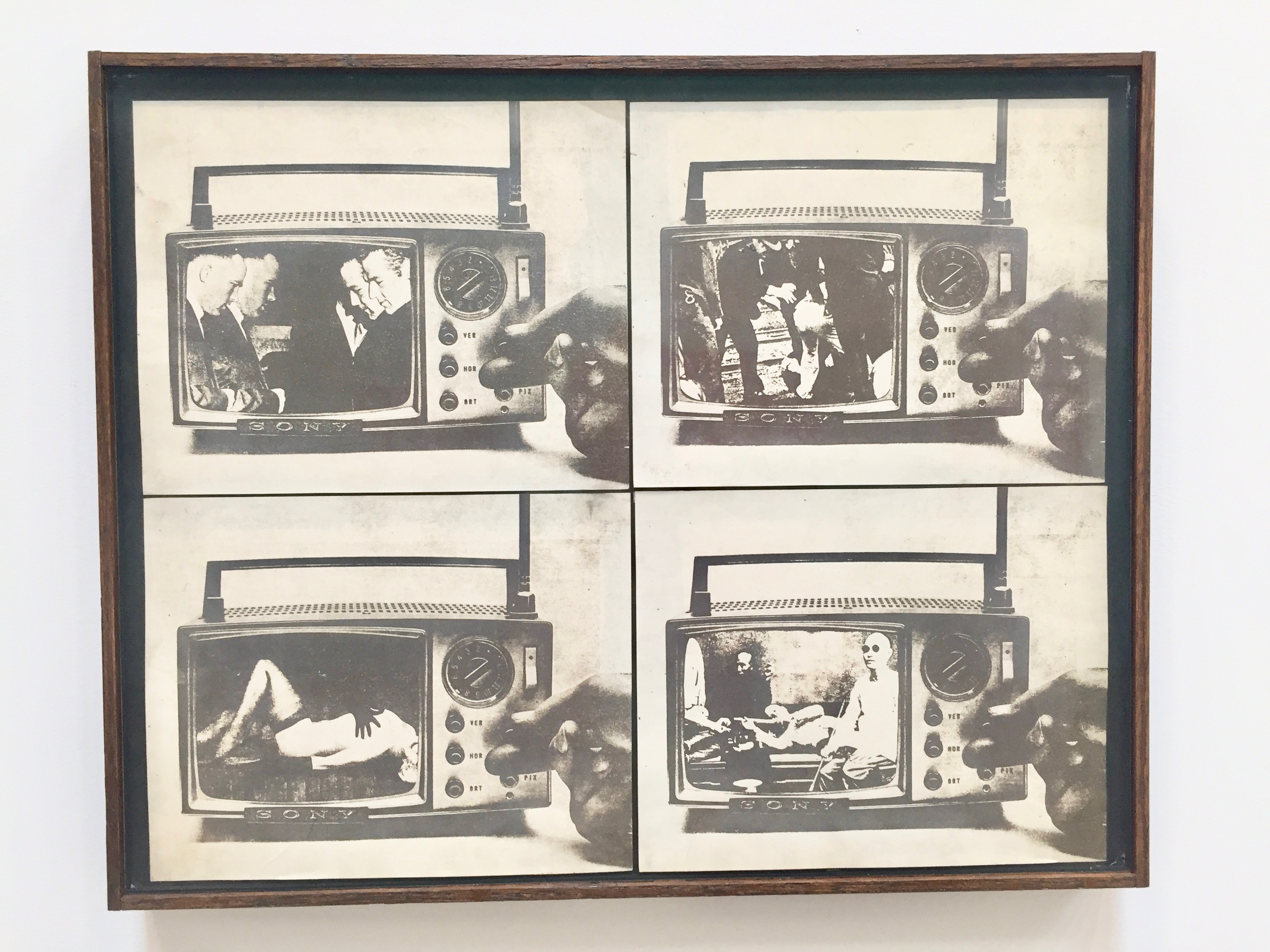
One of Berman's Verifax creations.

His art embodied the kind of interdisciplinary leanings and interests that, in time, would come to help characterize the Beat movement as a whole.

— Andy Brumer

Berman created Verifax collages, which consist of photocopies of images from magazines and newspapers mounted onto a flat surface in collage fashion and mixed with occasional solid areas of acrylic paint. To make them, he used a Verifax copier (Kodak) machine to copy images he often juxtaposed in a grid format, creating what the critic Will Fenstermaker called "psychedelic typologies."

Berman was influenced by jazz music, rock music, poetry of his Beat circle, Surrealism, Dada, and the Kabbalah. Though he was not religious, the influence of the Kabbalah and Jewish mysticism is seen in his collages that included Hebrew letters. These letters also appear in his only film, Aleph. His involvement with the jazz scene allowed him opportunities to work with jazz musicians, creating bebop album covers for Charlie Parker.

Wallace Berman and other artists with 2 undercover Vice Squad officers, looking at Wally Hedrick's sculpture Sunflower (1952), during the now-famous LAPD obscenity arrest at Ferus Gallery in 1957.

In 1957 Berman had his first exhibition of his artworks at the newly opened Ferus Gallery in Los Angeles. His friends were the curators/owners of the gallery, Ed Kienholz, Robert Alexander, and Walter Hopps. After the opening, the L.A. vice squad got a telephone tip from an anonymous caller and during the raid they found what was deemed a pornographic image by Cameron Parsons titled Peyote Vision at the bottom of Berman's assemblage work Temple. He was convicted of displaying lewd and obscene materials. At the summation in the courtroom, Berman wrote on the blackboard "There is no justice, only revenge". His actor-friend Dean Stockwell paid the $150 fine to release Berman. Ferus was the last showing in a public gallery for Berman during his life.

== Semina ==
His mail art publication Semina was a series of folio packages that were limited edition and sent or given to his friends. Semina consisted of collages mixed with poetry by writers Michael McClure, Philip Lamantia, David Meltzer, Charles Bukowski, William S. Burroughs, Allen Ginsberg, Jean Cocteau, John Kelly Reed, and Berman, under the pseudonym Pantale Xantos. Semina was published from 1955 to 1964. The cover of the first issue featured a photograph of artist and occultist Marjorie Cameron. The volume also included Cameron's drawing Peyote Vision. This artwork was featured in Berman's 1957 exhibition at Los Angeles's Ferus Gallery, which was raided and shut down by police. Investigating officers claimed that Peyote Vision, which featured two copulating figures, was pornographic.

== Aleph ==
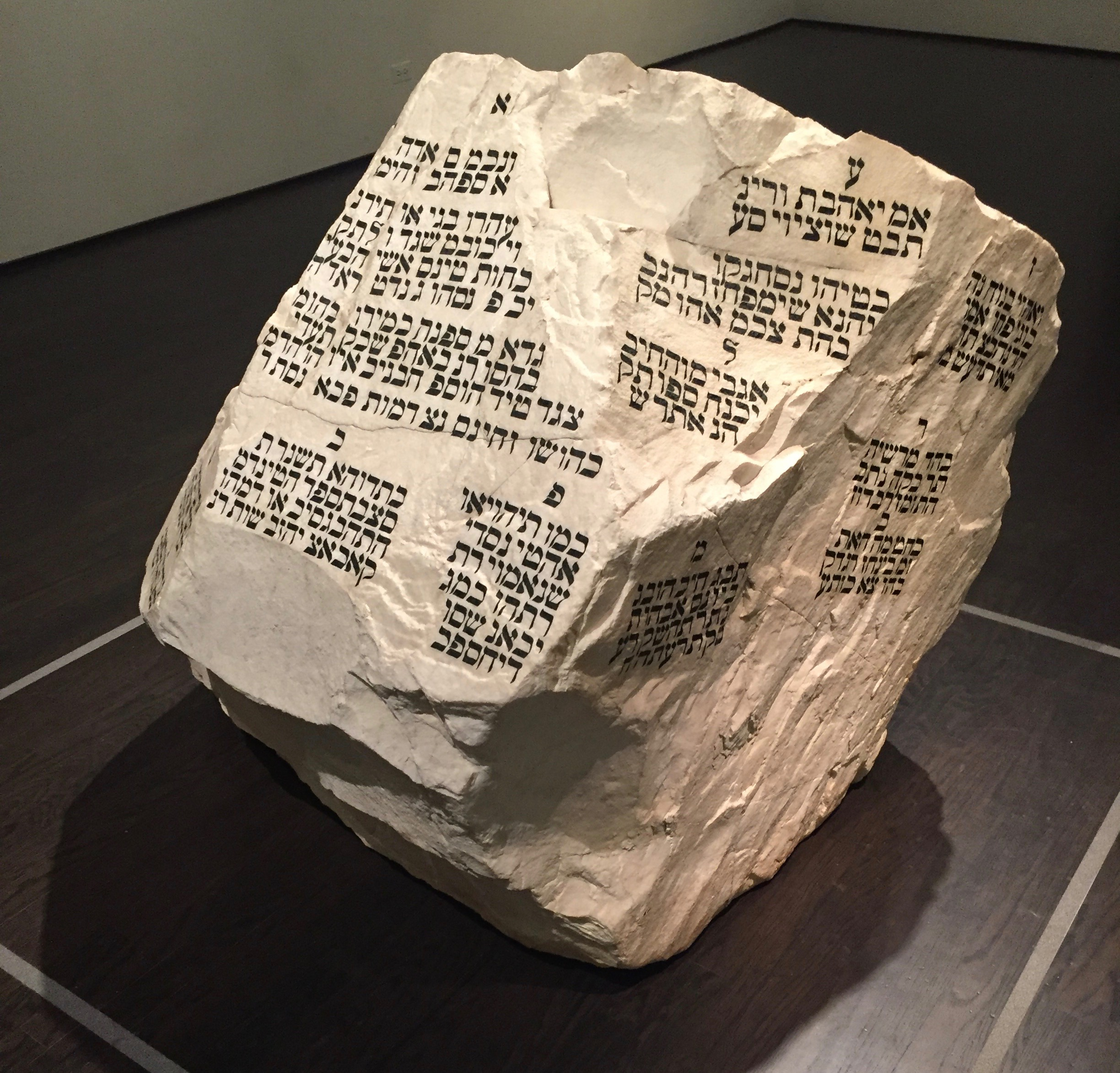
Topanga Seed, 1969-1970, by Wallace Berman.

Berman created a six-minute 8mm silent experimental film, Aleph, that he worked on from 1958 to 1976. He began work on it soon after the release of the first issues of Semina, and it incorporates techniques from collage and painting. The film includes hand coloring, Letraset symbols, and collage portraits of pop-culture icons superimposed on images of a Sony transistor radio. After Berman's death, filmmaker Stan Brakhage salvaged the film and enlarged it to 16mm for public screening. The film was named Aleph by Berman’s son Tosh, after the first letter of the Hebrew alphabet, which his father had adopted as a monogram.

== Legacy ==
Berman's likeness appears on the album cover of the Beatles' 1967 Sgt. Pepper's Lonely Hearts Club Band. The portrait is from a photograph taken by Dean Stockwell. It is directly above John Lennon, two rows up, next to Tony Curtis. In 1992 Berman's papers were donated to the Archives of American Art by his son Tosh Berman.

== Notable exhibitions ==
- Wallace Berman - Visual Music, 2018, galerie frank elbaz, Paris
- Looking for Mushrooms, 2008, Ludwig Museum
- Trace du Sacre, 2008; Centre Pompidou
- Los Angeles 1955-1985 2006; Centre Pompidou
- California Modern, 2006; Orange County Museum of Art
- Subway Series: The New York Yankees and the American Dream, 2004; Bronx Museum of the Arts
- Evidence of Impact: Art and Photography 1963-1978, 2004; Whitney Museum of American Art
- Solo exhibition: Ferus Gallery, Los Angeles, 1957

== Notable collections ==
- Untitled, 1967; Norton Simon Museum
- di Rosa Collection
- Richard Prince private collection
- Museum of Contemporary Art, Los Angeles
