= Lightbox =

Translucent surface illuminated from behind

A lightbox is most commonly a translucent surface illuminated from behind, used for situations where a shape laid upon the surface needs to be seen with high contrast. A lightbox is also a blocked-off area of an overhanging roof, as over an extended eve, added to allow light to pass through.

== Types ==
Several varieties exist, depending on their purpose:

- Various backlit viewing devices:
  - A container with several lightbulbs and a pane of frosted glass on the top. It is used by photography professionals viewing transparent films, such as slides. This device was originally used to sort photographic plates with ease. When laid flat, it may be called a light table. Generally, a lightbox uses light similar to daylight (5,000–6,000 kelvins (K)) and has uniform light strength on the glass pane.
  - In the form of vertical panels, they can also be found mounted on the walls of hospitals and medical offices to review X-ray images (X-ray illuminator).
  - In the science field, lightboxes are often used for looking at bacterial growth and allow better visualization for PCR plates.
  - A lighted display panel used for advertising purposes. The panel can be illuminated by fluorescent light bulbs or LED lighting strips. The efficiency of light boxes improved dramatically after the introduction of LED technology. The user inserts a graphic, which can be changed easily. Some light boxes are designed especially for outdoor purposes so they are more weatherproof.
- The fabric reflectors that attach to studio lighting via a connector to create soft lighting by diffusing the strobe flash are called "light boxes". They generally come in various rectangle or octagon shapes. Interior reflectors can be white, silver or gold to alter the temperature of light. Baffling inserts are also available.
  - A variation of this is a box, with one open end, made of diffusing material, to allow the photographing of a sample object with no shadows. It is also called light tent or photo cube.
- A folder used on stock photography to allow a user to organize digital photos. Photos can be assigned to a viewable lightbox folder by subject, for later convenience, or used to compile unrelated photos for a specific project layout. Lightboxes also allow graphic designers to show clients options for a project in one simple uncluttered folder.
- The card-reader near the door in a hotel room, used as the main electric switch
- A blocked-off area of an overhanging roof, as over an extended eve, which allows light to pass through.

== Gallery ==
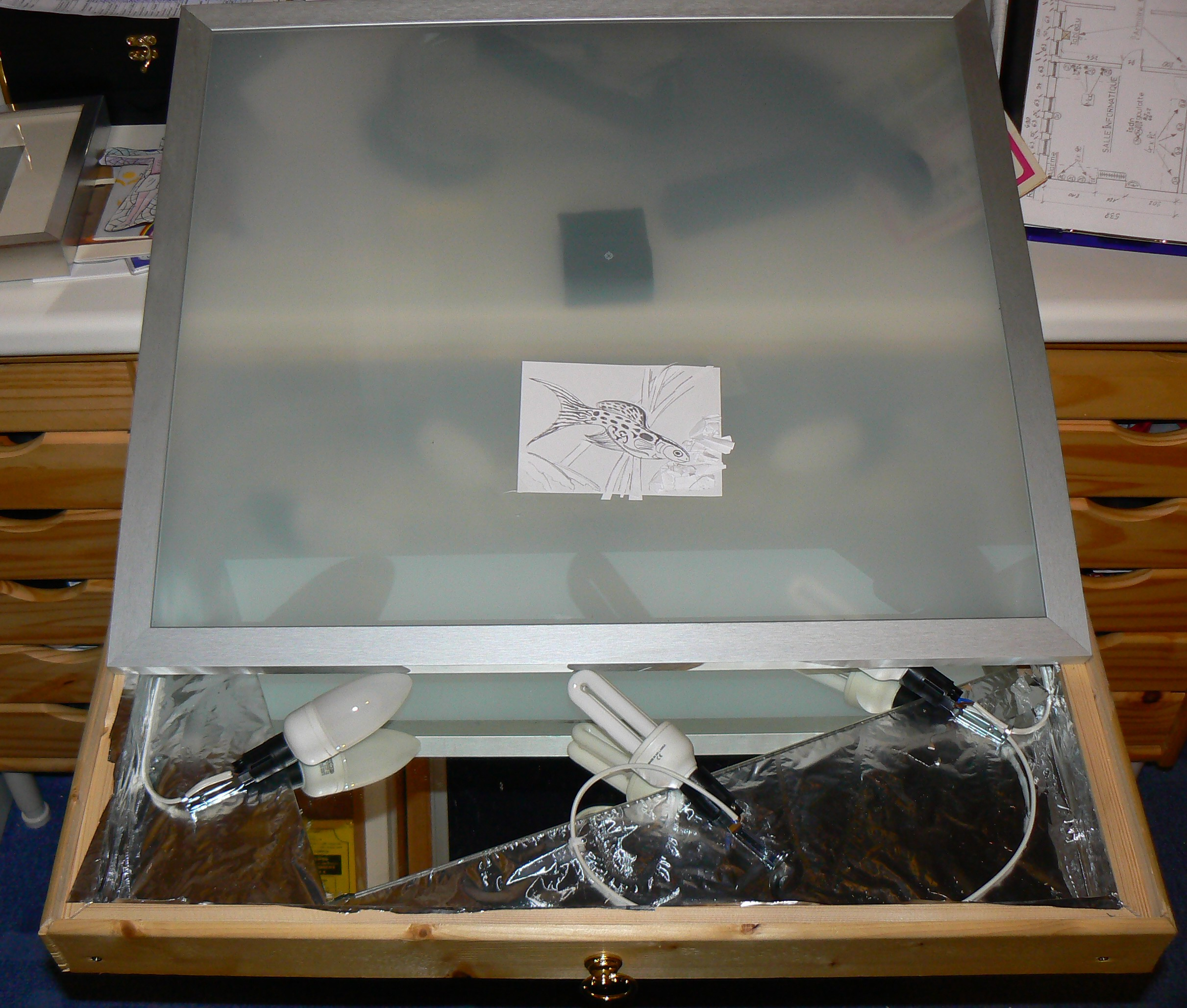
Small lightbox opened to reveal workings

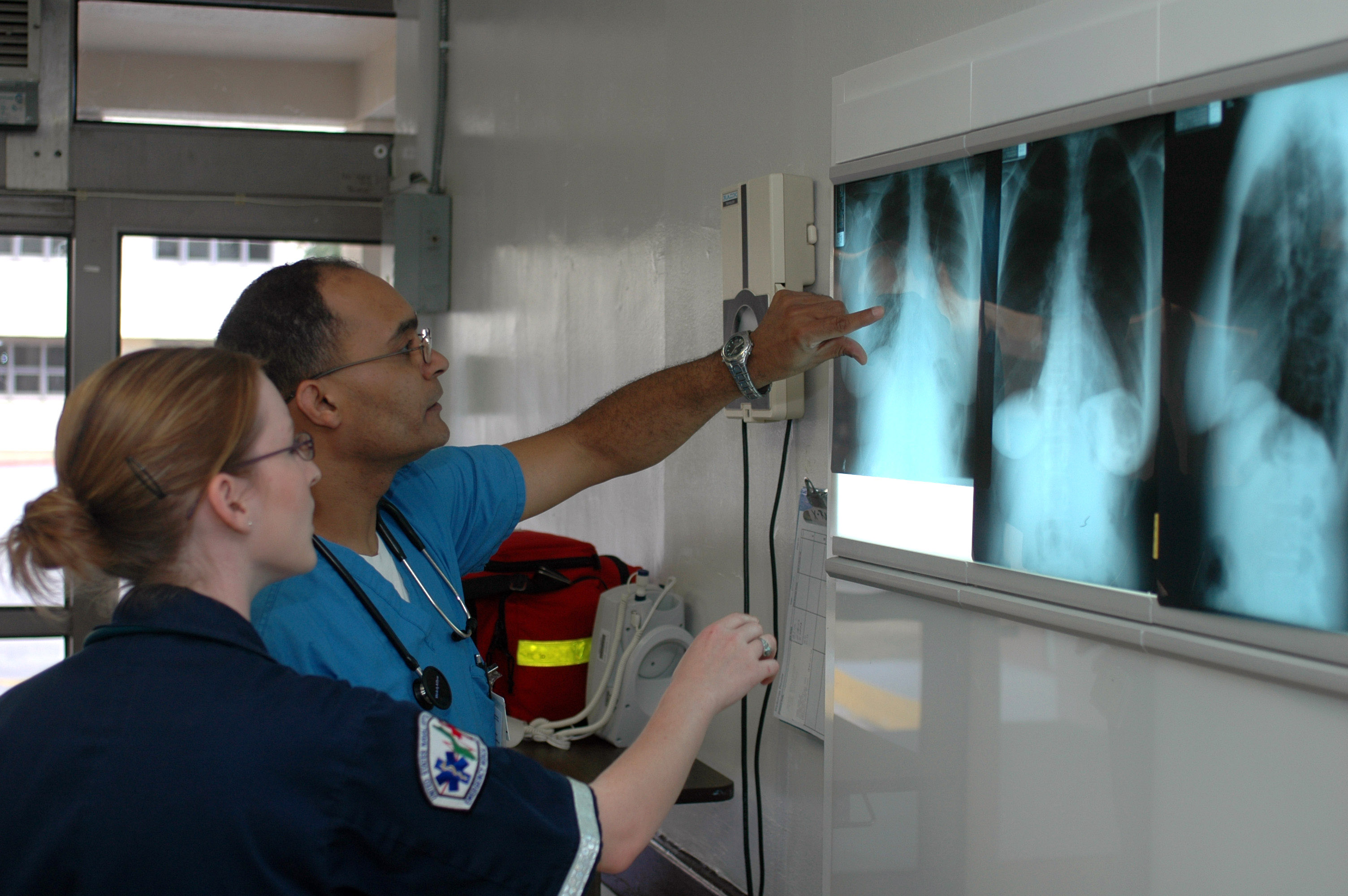
Wall mounted lightbox for inspecting medical X-rays

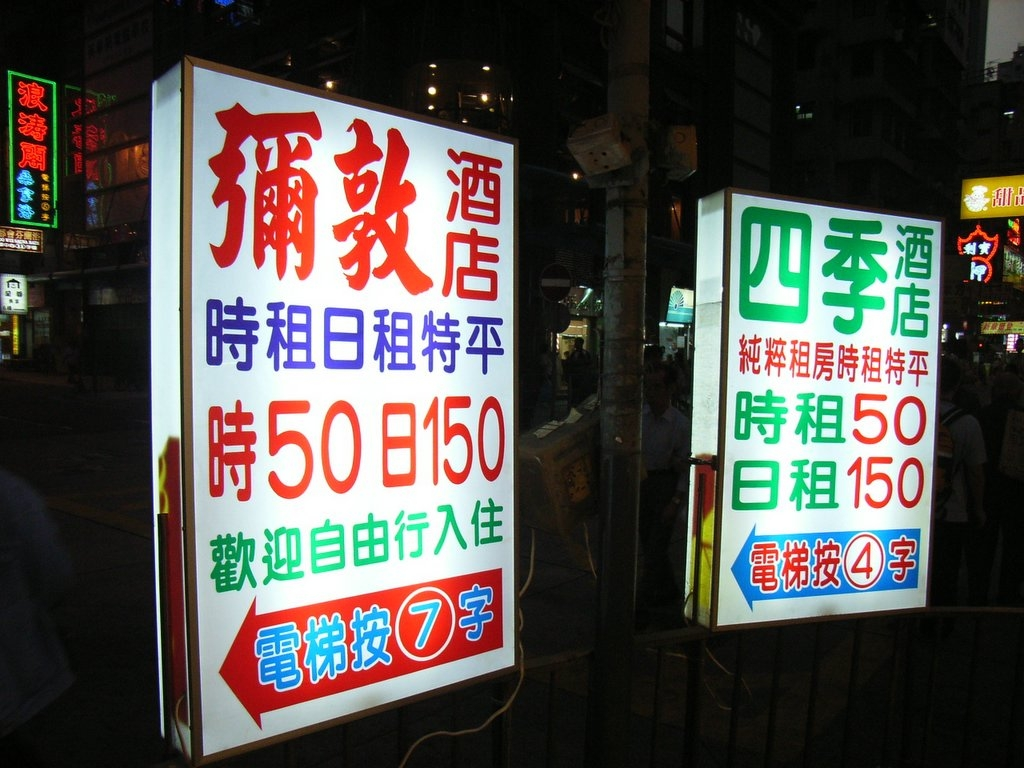
Lightbox used in outdoor advertising

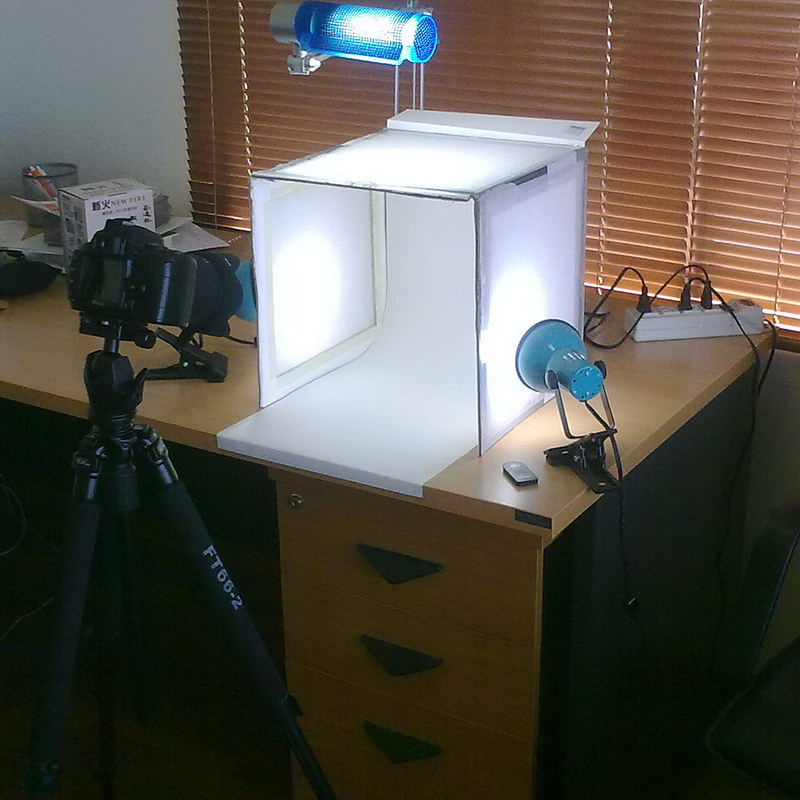
Lightbox designed to produce images with diffuse lighting from all angles

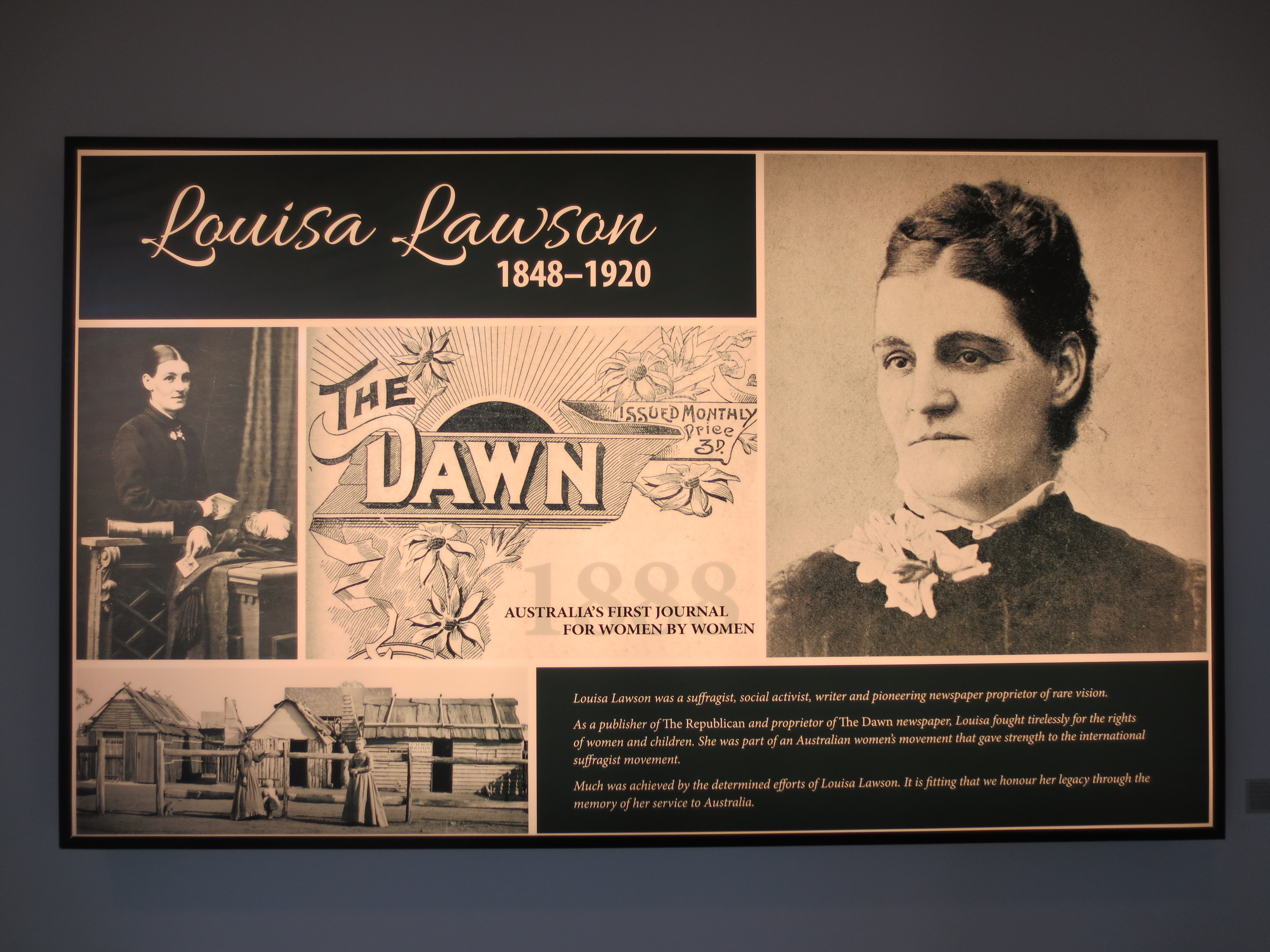
Lightbox used as a Memorial Plaque

== See also ==
- Light table
- Blueprint
- Heliographic copier
- Thermal copier
- Verifax copier
