= 7 South Dearborn =

General information
- Status: Never built
- Type: Residential
- Operator: JK Equities, Time Equities and Oak Capitals

Height
- Antenna spire: 2,000 feet (610 m)
- Roof: 1,567 feet (477.6 m)

Technical details
- Floor count: 112

Design and construction
- Architect: Adrian Smith

7 South Dearborn was a planned skyscraper in Chicago, United States. Located at the intersection of Madison and Dearborn, the building would have been 1,567 feet (478 m) high, with twin antennas pushing the height to exactly 2,000 feet (610 m). The building would have been the tallest building in the Western Hemisphere at the time, if it were constructed.

== Initial plans ==
Plans for the 112-story building were announced in 1999 by Scott Toberman of European-American Realty. This would have been the tallest in Chicago at 1,567 feet (478m), surpassing the Willis Tower by 116 feet (35 m). It would have also taken the title for world's tallest building, being 84 feet (26 m) taller than the Petronas Towers. A set of three 433-foot (132 m) broadcast antennas (not included in the official height) would have brought the total height of the structure to 2,000 feet (610 m).

== The site ==
The building took the site of the First Federal Building, a 240-foot (73 m), 18-story Classical office building designed in 1902 by Holabird & Roche. This building housed the offices of the Chicago Tribune until 1925, when the Tribune Tower was built. The building remained until 1999, when European-American Realty acquired the property and demolished it in preparations for 7 South Dearborn.

== Uses and size ==
7 South Dearborn would have been mixed-use, with 11 stories of retail and parking at the base, providing 800 spaces of parking, followed by 765,000 sq ft (71,100 m^{2}). of office space on 32 floors, then 360 residential units on 43 floors, topping out with 90,600 feet (27,600 m) of communications facilities on 13 floors. 4 floors of basement and 9 mechanical floors bring the total to 112 floors.

== Engineering ==
This building represented a major departure from convention by having a big height with small floorplates. This was made possible by a stayed-mast structural system in which columns around the perimeter ("stays") are linked radially to the core by multi-story trusses ("spreaders") at two points along the tower's shaft. The residential and communications floors would have been cantilevered out from the central core, to avoid perimeter columns and maximize views.

== History ==
In September 1999, the Chicago City Council approved the project.

In October 1999, Donald Trump offered to join European-American Realty in the project. European American Realty is a company managed by Scott Toberman, Harold Gootrad and the French Pierre Picard. They declined, so Trump began looking for other sites to invest in Chicago. Later, his efforts would culminate in the construction of Trump Tower Chicago, which used a design that borrowed much from 7 South Dearborn.

After being approved, Scott Toberman, CEO of European-American, faced difficulties in obtaining financing for the construction. In April 2000, after several failed financing attempts, the media companies backing the antenna aspect of the proposal backed out. European-American then defaulted on payment of a $22 million mortgage on the land, forcing Toberman to return the land deed to Banque Worms Capital Corp, a representative of his lender.

== Today ==
Later in 2000, several rumors circulated that the project would be revived, due to activity on the project site and several developers showing interest. Nothing ever came of it, and several years later, Hines Interests Ltd announced plans for a much more modest, 571-foot (174 m) building on the site called One South Dearborn. This building was completed in 2005.
