= One South Dearborn =

Office skyscraper in Chicago, Illinois

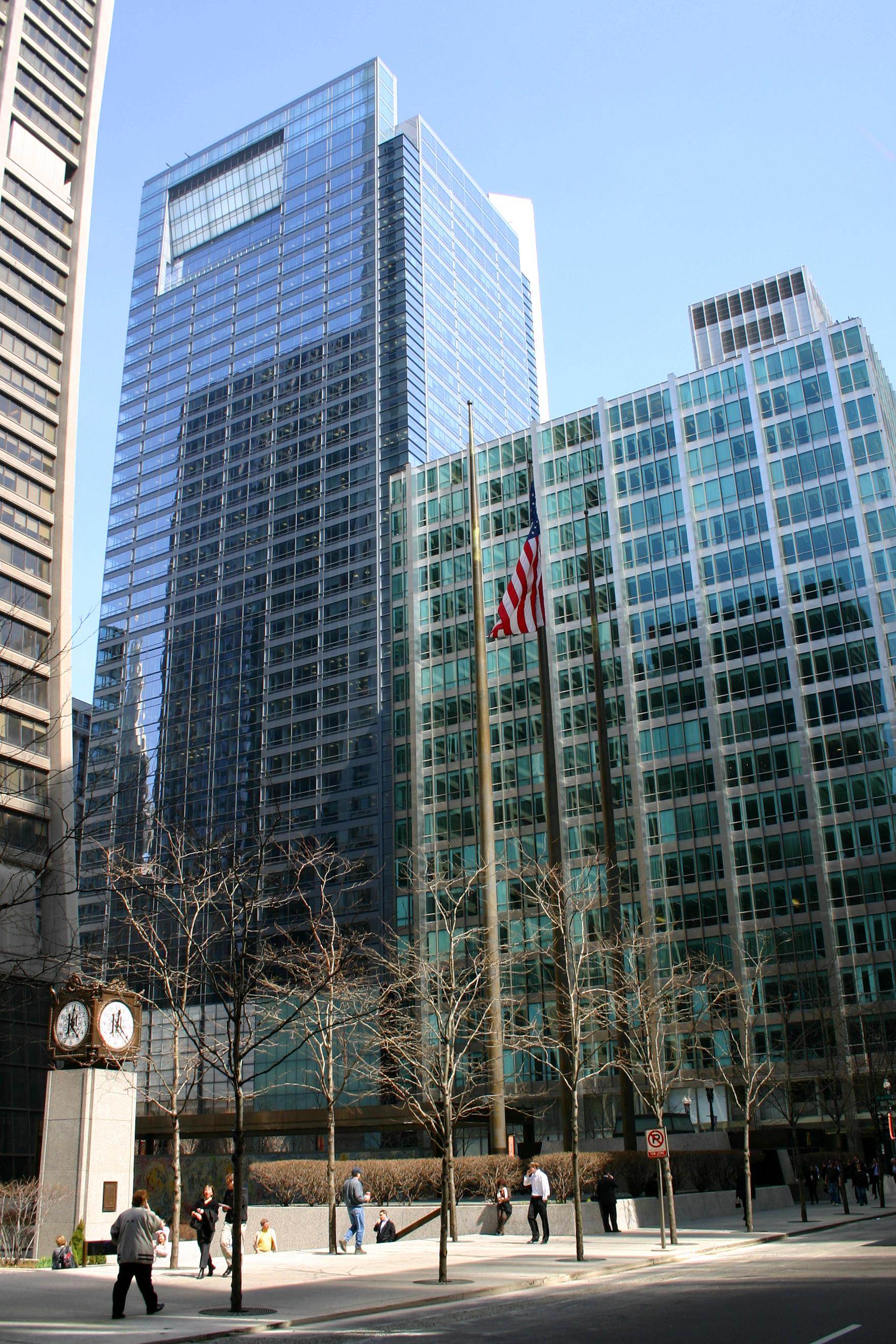
- One South Dearborn (left) is located directly north of the Inland Steel Building (right)
- Interactive map of the One South Dearborn area

General information
- Type: Office
- Location: 1 S. Dearborn St. Chicago, Illinois; United States
- Coordinates: 41°52′54″N 87°37′43″W
- Current tenants: Sidley Austin LLP
- Construction started: 2003
- Completed: 2005

Height
- Roof: 571 ft (174 m)
- Top floor: 502 ft (153 m)

Technical details
- Floor count: 39
- Floor area: 249,326 m^{2} (2,683,720 sq ft)
- Lifts/elevators: 19

Design and construction
- Architect: DeStefano Keating Partners
- Developer: Hines
- Structural engineer: Halvorson and Partners
- Main contractor: Turner Construction Company

One South Dearborn is a 571 ft (174m) tall skyscraper in Chicago, Illinois. An earlier proposal for the same site proposed a much taller 112-story building. The current anchor tenant is Sidley Austin LLP, which moved into One South Dearborn in November 2005 from Bank One Plaza.

== See also ==
- List of tallest buildings in Chicago
