= Stephen Kinsella (lawyer) =

Stephen Kinsella OBE (Born July 1960) is a British lawyer and campaigner. As a lawyer he specialised in European Union competition law. He served as Managing Partner of the Brussels office of Herbert Smith Freehills and later as Global Head of Antitrust at Sidley Austin. Following his legal career, he became involved in advocacy on media regulation and digital policy along with founding organisations such as; Clean Up the Internet, Law for a Change, and the Press Justice Project. He has also served as a trustee and acting chair of the human rights charity Reprieve.

== Legal career ==
=== Herbert Smith ===
Kinsella worked at the law firm Herbert Smith, serving as Managing Partner of the Brussels office and has advised on cases involving Warner Media, AOL, Carnival Corporation, P&O Ferries, and the FIA.

=== Sidley Austin ===
In 2005, Kinsella joined Sidley Austin LLP as head of its EU competition practice advising on competition and antitrust matters and represented clients such as Microsoft and eBay.

During this time, Kinsella served as chair of the International Bar Association competition and trade law committee and as chair of the international committee of the antitrust section of the American Bar Association. He was recognised in independent directories, including Who’s Who Legal: Thought Leaders 2019 for EU competition law.

=== Later advisory work ===
After retiring from private practice in 2020, he joined Flint Global as a senior adviser focusing on regulatory and public policy matters.

== Charitable and campaigning work ==
Kinsella founded Clean Up the Internet in 2019, a UK-based campaign focused on the role of anonymity and unverified accounts in online abuse and disinformation. The organisation proposed that social media platforms should offer users an option to verify their identity, with the ability to filter interactions with unverified accounts, as an alternative to banning anonymity outright. Kinsella gave oral evidence to the House of Commons Petitions Committee inquiry on tackling online abuse in November 2021, and the organisation's proposals were referenced by MPs in parliamentary debate on online anonymity and anonymous abuse. Clean Up the Internet subsequently submitted evidence to the Joint Committee on the Draft Online Safety Bill and to the Speaker's Conference on the security of candidates, MPs and elections.

Kinsella co-founded Law for Change in 2022, as a fund providing financial support for public-interest litigation. He has written about its work in publications including a Bar Council blog on access to justice.

He is founder and chair of trustees of the Press Justice Project, a charity established to support members of the public affected by press abuse and to provide education on press standards and accountability. The Project held its first conference, "Reputation, Privacy and the Future of Media Law", at Brown Rudnick's London office in October 2024. Kinsella has been a board member of the press reform group Hacked Off.

Kinsella has been a trustee and acting chair of Reprieve, a UK-based human rights charity campaigning against the death penalty.

He has also been involved with the Laura Kinsella Foundation, a registered UK charity which provides grants to other charitable organisations.

Earlier in his career, Kinsella served as president of the British Chamber of Commerce in Belgium and as president of the Brussels Shakespeare Society, the activities for which he was appointed OBE in 2002.

== Honours and recognition ==
In 2002, Kinsella was appointed Officer of the Order of the British Empire (OBE) for services to British commercial interests in Belgium.

In 2024, he was named one of five "Legal Heroes" by the Law Society of England and Wales, selected from 470 nominations, in recognition of his "exceptional contributions to legal practice and social justice". The Law Society cited his co-founding of Law for Change and his founding of Clean Up the Internet.

Kinsella was named a "Thought Leader" in Who's Who Legal: Thought Leaders 2019 for EU competition law, and listed among "Most Highly Regarded Individuals" in Who's Who Legal: Competition 2017. Teams he led at Sidley Austin were named "Competition Team of the Year" three times by The Lawyer and once by Legal Business, including the 2018 Lawyer Awards recognition for work on an abuse of dominance case against Google.

== Publications ==
- EU Technology Transfer Block Exemption (1998)
- Getting the Deal Through – Vertical Agreements (2014)
