= Sidley Austin =

U.S.-based corporate law firm

Sidley Austin LLP
- Headquarters: One South Dearborn; Chicago, Illinois, U.S.
- No. of offices: 21 worldwide
- No. of attorneys: 2,300
- Major practice areas: General practice
- Revenue: ▲$3.733 billion (2025)
- Profit per equity partner: $5,157,000 (2025)
- Date founded: 1866
- Founder: Norman Williams; John Leverett Thompson
- Company type: Limited liability partnership
- Website: sidley.com

Sidley Austin LLP is an American law firm with approximately 2,300 lawyers in 21 offices across the world, including North America, Europe, Asia, and Australia. It was established in 1866 and its headquarters is at One South Dearborn in Chicago's Loop. It is one of the largest law firms in the world in terms of revenue. Among its notable alumni are former U.S. President Barack Obama, former first lady Michelle Obama, and current U.S. Vice President JD Vance.

== History ==
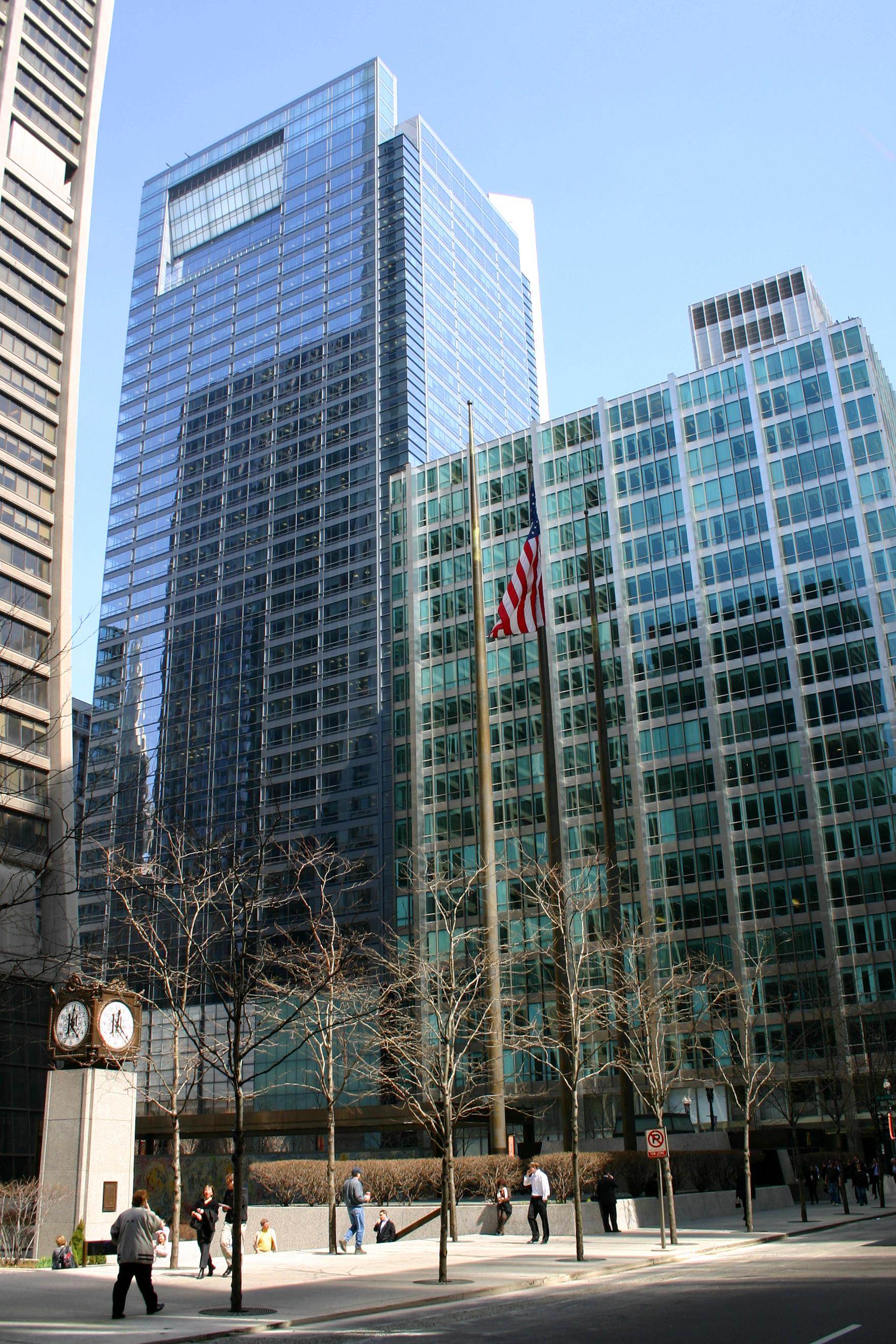
Headquarters of Sidley Austin at One South Dearborn

=== 1866–1900s: Origins in Chicago ===
In 1866, Norman Williams and John L. Thompson founded the law firm of Williams & Thompson in Chicago, Illinois. In 1876, the firm organized the Western Electric Company and Illinois Bell, and the Bell System became a longtime client. Mary Todd Lincoln was another early client, following her husband Abraham Lincoln's death.

William Pratt Sidley, who had joined the firm in 1892, was added to the firm's name in 1900 when it was renamed Holt, Wheeler & Sidley. Edwin C. Austin joined the firm in 1914. Among the firm's first clients were the Pullman Company, the manufacturer of specialty sleeping railway cars, as well as Western Electric and Illinois Steel.

=== 1900s: Expansion and consolidation ===
In 1963, former postmaster general J. Edward Day left the administration of President John F. Kennedy to establish the firm's Washington, D.C. office. Initial clients included the Advertising Mail Marketing Association.

In 1972, Sidley & Austin, with 100 lawyers, merged with the 50 lawyers of Chicago firm Leibman, Williams, Bennett, Baird & Minow. Additional offices were then established in London in 1974 and in Singapore and New York in 1982. Day, a chair of the firm's Washington, D.C., office prior to the merger, sued Sidley & Austin in response to the relocation of the merged firm's Washington office and being asked to share chairmanship of the office, although Day had approved and signed the merger agreement and amended partner agreement. A U.S. District Court judge dismissed the suit, and all appeals were denied. The case is sometimes cited in discussions of partnership law.

In 1975, Charles E. Lomax joined the firm, later becoming its first black partner. His clients included Don King and Muhammad Ali, for whom the firm arranged fights. In the late 1970s and early 1980s, Sidley & Austin represented AT&T in the time leading up to and during United States v. AT&T.

In 1985, Sidley & Austin became the first law firm to establish a standalone appellate practice for U.S. Supreme Court cases, recruiting Benjamin W. Heineman Jr. to lead it, as well as former U.S. Solicitor General Rex E. Lee. By 2012, the firm had argued 106 Supreme Court cases and was involved in approximately 40% of the cases the Court heard each year. The head of Sidley's D.C. office, Carter Phillips, had argued 76 cases before the Supreme Court by June 2012, more than any other active lawyer.

Sidley & Austin was among several law firms involved in the Savings & Loan Crisis; the firm paid $7.5 million in 1991 to settle legal malpractice claims stemming from its representation of the Lincoln Savings and Loan Association.

Michelle Obama (born Robinson) met her future husband and future President Barack Obama in 1989 while both worked at Sidley, when Michelle was in her first year as an associate and Barack was a summer associate. In 1995, a group of women lawyers at Sidley co-founded the firm's Women in Leadership program.

=== 2000s ===
In 2001, the firm merged with Brown & Wood, a New York-based law firm established in 1914 with 400 attorneys and additional domestic offices in Washington, D.C., San Francisco and Los Angeles and overseas branches in London, Beijing and Hong Kong (where it practiced English law in addition to U.S. law). Brown & Wood was known for its securities, structured finance and securitization practices. Brown & Wood had offices in the World Trade Center on floors 54 and 56–59.

The combined firm planned to move into the World Trade Center; it was decorating and furnishing additional space when the September 11 attacks occurred. In July 2002, Sidley Austin moved into the Axa Equitable Center in Midtown Manhattan.

In 2002, Sidley was among the first law firms to establish a practice dedicated to international trade law. The firm signed on as the anchor tenant for One South Dearborn in Chicago in 2003.

In 2007, Sidley Austin agreed to pay $39 million as part of a settlement with the Internal Revenue Service, which allowed the firm to avoid criminal charges of alleged fraudulent tax shelter activities. The previous year, Sidley and KPMG agreed to pay $54 million to investors who bought the shelters.

Sidley Austin represented Airbus in petitioning the World Trade Organization to allow the European Union to take countermeasures against the U.S. government in response to its subsidies of Boeing, succeeding in 2019. As of 2019, the firm had represented a party in approximately half of the last 550 disputes brought before the World Trade Organization.

In April 2026, USA v. Fejal, et al revealed that a former law associate, who had worked for the firm for about four years, until 2017, was indicted, with 29 others, for insider trading in January 2026, after leading a scheme orchestrated over decades by a network that included some of his former Yale classmates. The indictment was released in May, in which prosecutors characterized affected law firms as victims of those charged.

Sidley maintains offices in 21 cities worldwide, adding Miami in 2022 and San Diego in 2024.

==== Lobbying for Chinese tech companies ====
In August 2019, Politico reported that the Chinese technology company, Huawei, hired Sidley Austin to lobby on their behalf after the Trump administration set restrictions on their business transactions with the U.S. Federal Government. Trade, sanctions, export controls, "and other national security-related topics," were to be the subjects of lobbying efforts, according to reported disclosure filings.

In October 2022, Reuters and Politico reported that Sidley Austin updated its registration under the Foreign Agents Registration Act as a lobbyist for Hikvision USA, a California-based subsidiary of the Chinese video surveillance company, as requested by the U.S. Justice Department. In their registration, the law firm reported having received approximately $7.4 million in fees since beginning their representation in 2018. The firm had initially registered under the U.S. Lobbying Disclosure Act when it was first retained by the company.

Sidley Austin was hired by DJI Technologies in early 2024 after the drone maker was dropped by other agencies in February of that year.

== Recognition ==
Sidley Austin is the sixth-largest law firm in the world by revenue in 2025, according to The American Lawyer. The firm has approximately 2,300 lawyers and annual revenue over $3.4 billion. The firm is one of the highest-paying companies in the U.S.

In 2018, Sidley was named Competition & Regulatory Team of the Year at The Lawyer Awards in London.

As of 2020, the firm was named "Law Firm of the Year" in Trade & Customs by Who's Who Legal for 15 consecutive years.

In 2024, Sidley has been named a “Firm of the Year” in six categories at the China Business Law Awards 2024.

== Pro bono work ==
Sidley Austin partner George Fatheree worked pro bono on behalf of the descendants of Willa and Charles Bruce to execute the return of beachfront land which had been seized by Los Angeles authorities in the 1920s. The couple had lost the property, known as Bruce's Beach, when the state claimed it for public use and sold it to private investors. It was officially restored to the couple's great-grandsons, Marcus and Derrick Bruce, on July 20, 2022. The effort involved more than 1,000 hours of pro bono work.

In June 2025, the firm, as co-counsel with the National Veterans Legal Services Program (NVLSP), succeeded at the Supreme Court in the pro bono class-action suit, Soto v. United States, resulting in the Department of Defense retraction of limitations on retroactive combat-related special compensation benefits. The decision ruled that the Combat-Related Special Compensation statute's settlement mechanism supersedes the six-year statute of limitations previously enshrined in the Barring Act (31 U.S.C. § 3702), granting approximately 9,000 combat-disabled veterans full, retro-active special compensation.

== Associates and alumni ==
- David Barlow, United States district judge of the United States District Court for the District of Utah
- Benjamin Beaton, U.S. district judge of the United States District Court for the Western District of Kentucky
- James M. Cole, partner; deputy attorney general of the United States and author of the Cole Memorandum
- J. Edward Day, postmaster general of the United States
- George Deukmejian, governor of California
- Joseph D. Kearney, dean of Marquette University Law School
- Stephen Kinsella (lawyer), Founder of Law For Change, the Press Justice Project, and Clean Up The Internet
- Melat Kiros, Democratic nominee for Colorado's 1st congressional district
- Rex E. Lee, solicitor general of the United States and the 10th president of Brigham Young University
- Newton N. Minow, chair of the Federal Communications Commission during the Kennedy administration
- Ryan D. Nelson, U.S. circuit judge of the Court of Appeals for the Ninth Circuit
- Barack Obama, president of the United States (summer associate in the firm's Chicago office)
- Michelle Obama, first lady of the United States
- David Otunga, actor, professional wrestler and lawyer
- Peter Roskam, partner; U.S. representative for Illinois's 6th congressional district
- Adlai Stevenson II
- Andy Strenio, member of the Federal Trade Commission
- David S. Tatel, United States circuit judge of the United States Court of Appeals for the District of Columbia Circuit
- JD Vance, United States senator from Ohio and vice president of the United States
- John D. Zeglis, chief executive officer of AT&T Wireless

== See also ==
- List of largest United States-based law firms by profits per partner
