= Edith Weyde =

German chemist

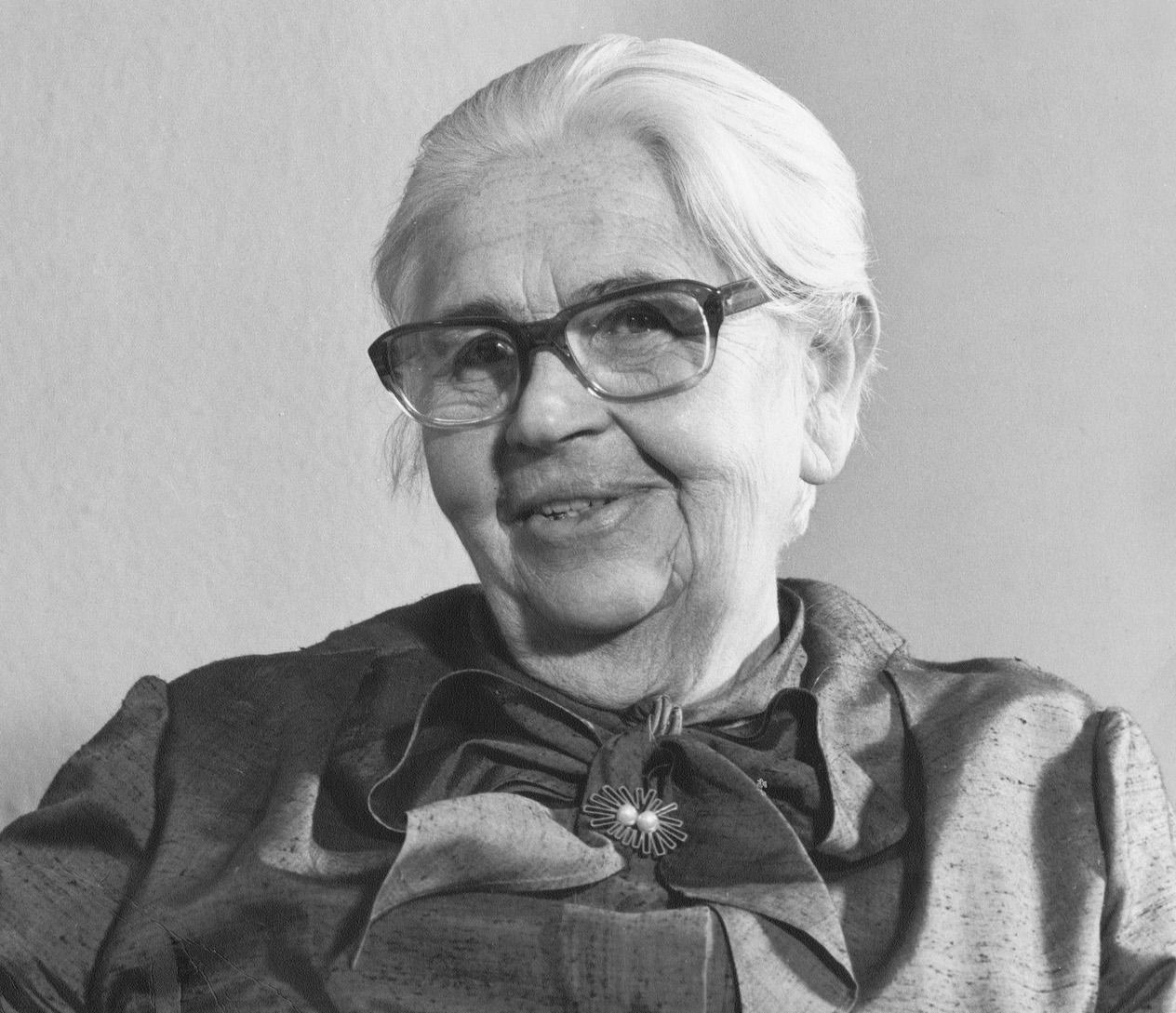
Edith Weyde

Edith Weyde (17 September 1901 – 10 February 1989) was a German chemist. She developed the silver salt Diffusion transfer—"Copyrapid"—which paved the way for the first photocopiers and instant photography. She also laid the foundation for color photography.

== Early life and education ==
Weyde was the second child of an Austrian grammar school teacher in Prague. She grew up in Aussig and finished her Abitur in 1919. Then, she worked for four years as a laboratory assistant for the Verein für chemische und metallurgische Produktion. In 1923, she began studying chemistry at the Technical University of Dresden. Four years later, she finished her doctorate with Robert Luther at the Photographic Institute of the Technical University of Dresden.

== Professional life ==
Weyde started her first job in the photographic-photochemical laboratory of I.G. Farbenindustrie AG in Oppau in 1928. After four years, she was transferred to the Agfa photo-paper factory in Leverkusen. She worked on improving the tropical suitability of photographic paper and for this purpose developed stabilizers for the photographic layers. She was involved in the development of the first Agfacolor papers from 1937 and contributed to the success of early color photography.

== Inventions ==
Weyde developed the silver salt Diffusion transfer method—also called "Copyrapid"—which was a process for the accelerated production of a photographic positive image according to an original. This led to the development of photocopiers, instant film and instant cameras.

== Awards ==
- 1963 Kulturpreis of the Deutschen Gesellschaft für Photographie
- Silberne Gesellschaftmedaille of the Fotografische Gesellschaft Wien
- 1965 Honorary Membership of the Society for Imaging Science and Technology
- 1965 Diesel-Medaille of the Erfinder-Verband Nürnberg
- 1973 Honorary Fellow of the Royal Photographic Society London

Also, a street in Leverkusen is named after her.
