= Tosh Berman =

American writer (born 1954)

Tosh Berman (born 1954) is a writer and poet whose work often focuses on figures of post-war France such as Jacques Mesrine, Serge Gainsbourg and Boris Vian.

Berman also founded the publishing house TamTam Books where he works as a publisher and editor. He also works as a buyer for the independent, Los Angeles–based book store Book Soup. His parents were the 1960s icons Wallace and Shirley Berman.

== Selected works ==
- Sparks-Tastic: Twenty-One Nights with Sparks in London, (Rare Bird Books, 2013) ISBN 9780983925583
- The Plum in Mr. Blum's Pudding, (Penny-Ante, 2014) ISBN 9780978556426
- Tosh: Growing Up in Wallace Berman's World, (City Lights, 2019) ISBN 9780872867604
