= Verifax copier =

Patented photo copying approach by Kodak

The Kodak verifax is a photo copying approach that uses a wet colloidal diffusion transfer technique patented by Yutzy, H.C. and Yackel, E.C. (1947) The light source is projected to the top crossing the negative being reflected -more or less, according to the color- against the original to be copied exposing the negative. Has a base that contains the recipient with the liquid developer and the exposure timer.

Due to its extreme simplicity, the method was commonplace until the late 1960s, when it was surpassed by the popularity of the xerocopies using plain paper. Copies had some chemical smell and lost contrast over time.

== Diffusion transfer ==
The DT (Diffusion transfer) was widespread in several countries since 1960:

- CopyRapid Agfa;
- Gevacopy of Gevaert (1950);
- Verifax Kodak (1952-1976);
- Copyproof (1980?);

Other products not specifically intended for copying, but employing a similar PMT technology include: Kodak Ektaflex (1981); Polaroid, sepia (1948), id, White Black (1950), id, color (1963)...

== Process ==
- The original sheet to be copied is placed face-down against the shiny side of a sheet of translucent sensitized "negative matrix" paper, then placed with the matte side of the matrix paper against the glass.
- The papers are exposed to light (not infrared) for about 15 seconds, where shorter exposure darkens the copy, and longer exposure lightens it.
- The original sheet is removed, and the matrix paper is immersed into the developing solution for 30 seconds, then extracted by pulling it out through pressure rollers, finishing the negative.
- This wet negative is pressed against a sheet of sensitized copy paper, and fed back through the rollers, giving gentle pressure.
- Finally, the two sheets are peeled apart, obtaining a slightly damp copy of the original, that has to lay on some surface while waiting to dry-out.

== See also ==
- Light table
- Photo mask
- Diazo copier
- Photolith
- Thermal Copier
- Edith Weyde
